= Healthcare in New Orleans =

Overview of the health care system in New Orleans, Louisiana, United States

Healthcare in New Orleans includes a combination of hospitals, clinics, and other organization for the residents of New Orleans, Louisiana.

== History ==
L’Hospital des Pauvres de la Charite was opened in 1736 as a charitable institution and was a modest operation then located on the corner of Chartres and Bienville streets. This institution later evolved into Charity Hospital, located on Tulane Avenue, which was constructed in 1939; at the time, it was the second largest hospital in the United States. Charity Hospital was closed in 2005 after significant damage was caused by Hurricane Katrina. University Medical Center New Orleans was opened in 2015 as a partial replacement for Charity Hospital and other closed or deprecated institutions within the city.

== Hospitals ==
- Children's Hospital of New Orleans
- Medical Center of Louisiana at New Orleans
- Ochsner Baptist Medical Center
- Ochsner Medical Center
- Touro Infirmary
- Tulane Medical Center
- University Hospital, New Orleans

=== Closed hospitals ===
- Charity Hospital
- Lindy Boggs Medical Center

== Medical education ==
- Louisiana State University Health Sciences Center New Orleans
- Tulane University School of Medicine
- Xavier University of Louisiana College of Pharmacy
- Delgado Community College Allied Health programs

== Other organizations ==
- New Orleans Emergency Medical Services
