= LCMC Health System =

Nonprofit network of healthcare providers in Southern Louisiana

LCMC Health
- New logo unveiled in 2019. Hospitals in the system all have logos consistent with this.
- Formation: 2009
- Founded at: New Orleans, Louisiana
- Merger of: Children's Hospital New Orleans and Touro Infirmary
- Headquarters: 1100 Poydras Street; New Orleans, LA 70168
- Coordinates: 29.917258°N 90.125221°W
- Region served: Louisiana
- Services: healthcare
- Key people: Greg Feirn (C.E.O.)
- Staff: 9,368
- Volunteers: 2,499
- Website: LCMC Health website
- Formerly called: Louisiana Children's Medical Center

LCMC Health System (formerly known as Louisiana Children's Medical Center) is a nonprofit network of healthcare providers in Southern Louisiana, based out of New Orleans. Members include academic centers, acute care facilities, and research hospitals. LCMC Health, along with Ochsner, dominate the Louisiana health and hospital space.

Along with their 6 hospitals and physicians offices, LCMC Health operates a network of urgent care centers across the greater New Orleans area.

== History ==
Children's Hospital New Orleans and Touro Infirmary merged into one hospital system in 2009. Louisiana Children's Medical Center, the parent of Children's Hospital, became the parent to both hospitals. Louisiana Children's Medical Center was later renamed LCMC Health to help reflect that the network is not only for children.

In December 2012, it was announced that LSU Health Systems would transfer the management of ILH to Louisiana Children's Medical Center, a non-profit corporation that manages Children's Hospital and Touro Infirmary. The plan also called for LCMC Health to acquire University Medical Center Management Corporation (UMCMC), a non profit corporation originally established to manage and operate the University Medical Center, a $1.1 billion facility that opened on August 1, 2015. ILH's transition from public to private management took place in June 2013.

In November 2013, LCMC Health signed a letter of intent to operate under construction New Orleans East Hospital. The hospital was planned to cost about $130 million, and consist of 80-beds.

The State of Louisiana entered into a contract with LCMC Health to operate and run the newly constructed University Medical Center, New Orleans. The 1.1 billion dollar hospital opened on August 1, 2015, as a replacement for Charity Hospital and University Hospital. University Medical Center New Orleans is affiliated with the LSU Health Sciences Center New Orleans and Tulane University School of Medicine. The hospital is managed by LCMC Health, a private not-for-profit hospital system.

On October 1, 2015, LCMC Health took over operations of West Jefferson Medical Center as part of a three-year lease from the government of Jefferson Parish. Lease papers were exchanged, and LCMC Health wired Jefferson Parish the lease's $200 million up-front payment.

In June 2019 financially unstable East Jefferson General Hospital's board of directors entered into a memorandum of understanding with LCMC Health aimed at exploring a possible partnership. In February 2020 EJGH officials were forced to sell the hospital to LCMC Health at a cost of $90 million to avoid going into bankruptcy. LCMC Health plans to pump over $100 million into the hospital in mainly infrastructure upgrades.

In early 2020 LCMC Health tightened visitor restrictions across all of their hospitals to prevent the further spread of COVID-19 within their hospitals. Restrictions included having all visitors be required to wear a mask while inside the facility and undergo temperature checks before any visitation could take place. Also, many patients were limited to having only one visitor with them in cases such as labor and delivery and outpatient procedures. The network also participated in daily conference calls with competitor hospitals and government agencies to determine best practices when dealing with COVID patients.

Tulane University and LCMC announced on October 10, 2022, that LCMC would purchase Tulane Medical Center (along with Lakeview Regional Medical Center, and Tulane Lakeside Hospital) from HCA for $150 Million.

== Hospitals ==
Hospitals in LCMC Health
| Hospital | Location | Beds | Date Joined LCMC | Type | Image |
|---|---|---|---|---|---|
| Manning Family Children's | New Orleans, Louisiana | 221 | Founding | Children's Hospital | |
| Touro Infirmary | New Orleans, Louisiana | 325 | Founding | Teaching Hospital | |
| University Medical Center New Orleans | New Orleans, Louisiana | 324 | August 1, 2015 (From Opening) | Tertiary Teaching Hospital | |
| New Orleans East Hospital | New Orleans, Louisiana | | 2014 | Teaching Hospital | |
| West Jefferson Medical Center | Marrero, Louisiana | | October 1, 2015 | Teaching Hospital | |
| East Jefferson General Hospital | Metairie, Louisiana | | February 27, 2020 | | |

== See also ==
- LSU Health Sciences Center New Orleans
