= West Jefferson Medical Center =

Coordinates: 29.89172°N 90.09475°W

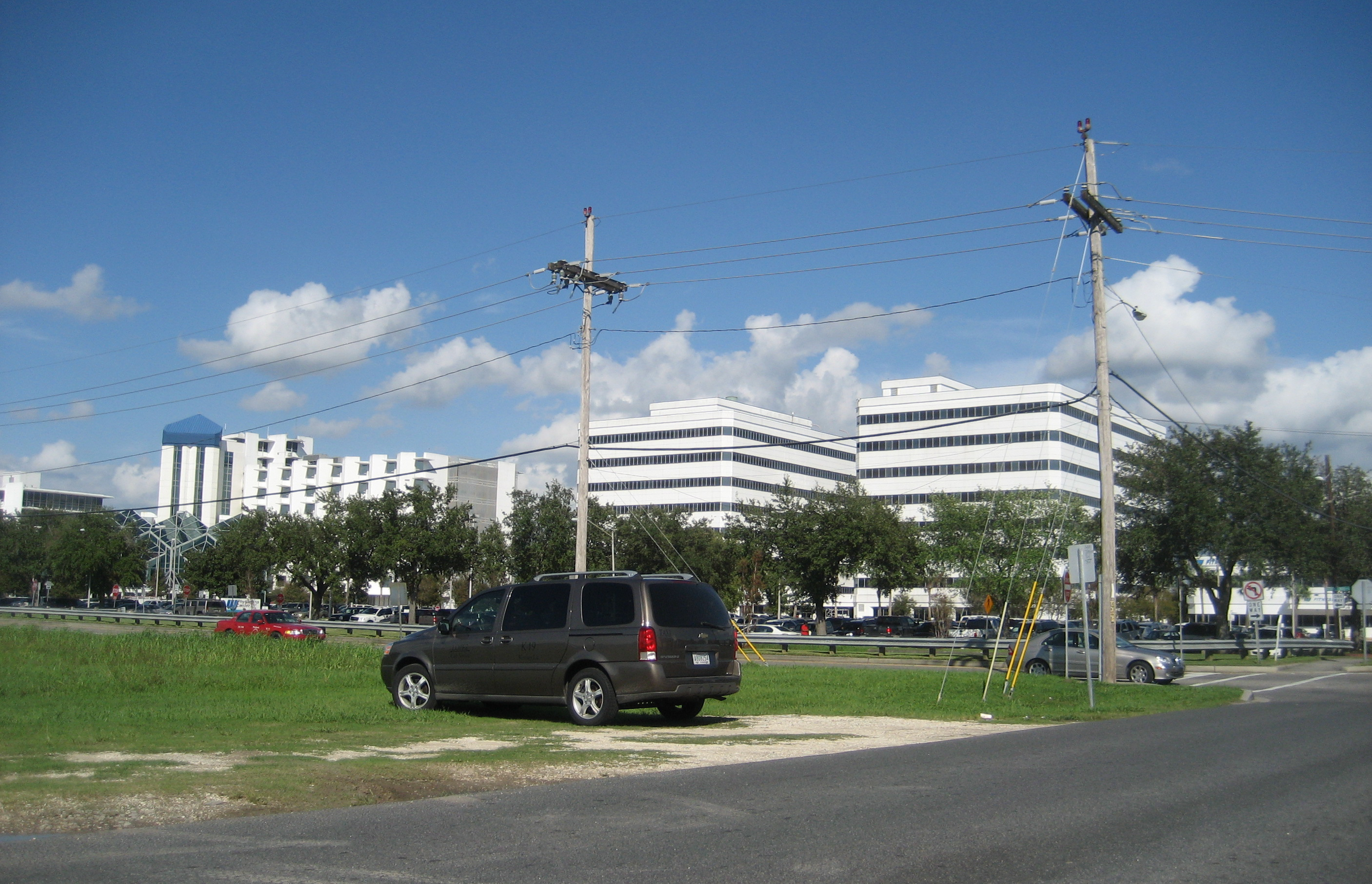

The West Jefferson Medical Center (West Jefferson) is a 419-bed community hospital located in Marrero, Louisiana, United States. It is located 15 minutes from Downtown New Orleans in a region known as the Westbank. Established in 1956, West Jefferson Medical Center is situated near vast industrial and maritime corridors and offers a full set of medical services in the Westbank region of Jefferson, Plaquemines, and St. Charles Parishes. The hospital is a part of the LCMC Health System.

== Creation and development ==
Following World War II, Jefferson Parish experienced exponential population growth, doubling from 1940 to 1950, and then doubling again from 1950 to 1960. In 1956, there were no hospitals in Jefferson Parish and the hospitals in neighboring New Orleans were only accessible from the West Bank by ferry across the Mississippi River.

In early 1956, a group of West Bank physicians were appointed to a private committee that were joined by a committee selected by the Jefferson Parish Policy Jury. From this committee, the Police Jury formed the Board of Commissioners of the Jefferson Hospital Service District No. 1, which was tasked to explore options for developing and financing a new hospital that was to be established on the Westbank. After much research and discussion, consultants recommended criteria for a hospital to serve the ever-growing Westbank population with up to 63% of the funds would come from the Hill-Burton Act combined with 37% through locally matching funds.

A public bond referendum seeking approval for the sale of $1.5 million in bonds was voted upon and approved on September 25, 1956. The bonds would be repaid through a 1-mill property tax assessment collected over 10 years from owners in West Jefferson. The U.S. Government was to provide $1.2 million towards the project through the Hill-Burton Act.

With funding in place, the Board sought a plot of land that was located between the city of Westwego and the Harvey Canal and would provide between 10 and 20 acres for development. In February 1957, a 20-acre portion of land from the Hope Haven institute was purchased through the Archdiocese of New Orleans for the price of $156,290.

The hospital project was publicly solicited for bids, and a construction contract was signed with Keller Construction Corporation in September 1958 for $2,170,000. Construction began was completed by April, 1960. A formal dedication ceremony was held on April 3, with Msgr. Paul J. Gaudin, pastor of Immaculate Conception Church (Marrero). Officially opened as "West Jefferson General Hospital," its first patients were admitted on April 18, 1960.

== Hurricane Katrina ==
During the immediate aftermath of Hurricane Katrina in August 2005, WJMC and East Jefferson General Hospital in Metairie served as the main trauma centers for New Orleans due to severe damage to the city's main trauma center, the now-shuttered Charity Hospital, which was one of two constituent hospitals of the Medical Center of Louisiana at New Orleans. WJMC was chosen due to its proximity; the nearest Level I trauma center at that time was in Shreveport.

== Deepwater Horizon incident ==
West Jefferson also played a major role in treating oil rig workers who were injured in the Deepwater Horizon Explosion on April 20, 2010. Two of the injured men were brought to the ER by ambulance around 3:20 a.m., and the other two were flown in by helicopter around 5:45 a.m. All four workers were treated and released by 11:15 on April 21, 2010.

In May 2010, as the massive spill was still trying to be contained, West Jefferson treated a total of 11 oil spill workers who were complaining of illnesses they attributed to cleaning up oil from the Deepwater Horizon disaster. Seven workers were hospitalized on May 26 after complaining of dizziness, severe headaches, shortness of breath, nausea and skin irritations while working on boats off the Louisiana coast. Two days later, 2 more workers were brought to the ER by helicopter, and the following day 2 oil spill workers walked into the ER complaining of similar symptoms.

West Jefferson doctors believe the likely cause of the symptoms is exposure to some type of chemical irritant coupled with heat-related illnesses. The workers told doctors they believe the dispersants being sprayed to break up the oil made them sick.

On May 31, 2010, WJMC set up a 12-cot medical first-aid tent in Grand Isle to help treat people working on the Deepwater Horizon oil spill. The tent was set up on the Jefferson Parish Emergency Management compound. It was open daily from 12:30pm to 7:00pm, and was staffed by a nurse practitioner and the support of two EMT's.
