= University Hospital, New Orleans =

Coordinates: 29.9566°N 90.0851°W

Interim LSU Hospital
- LCMC Health
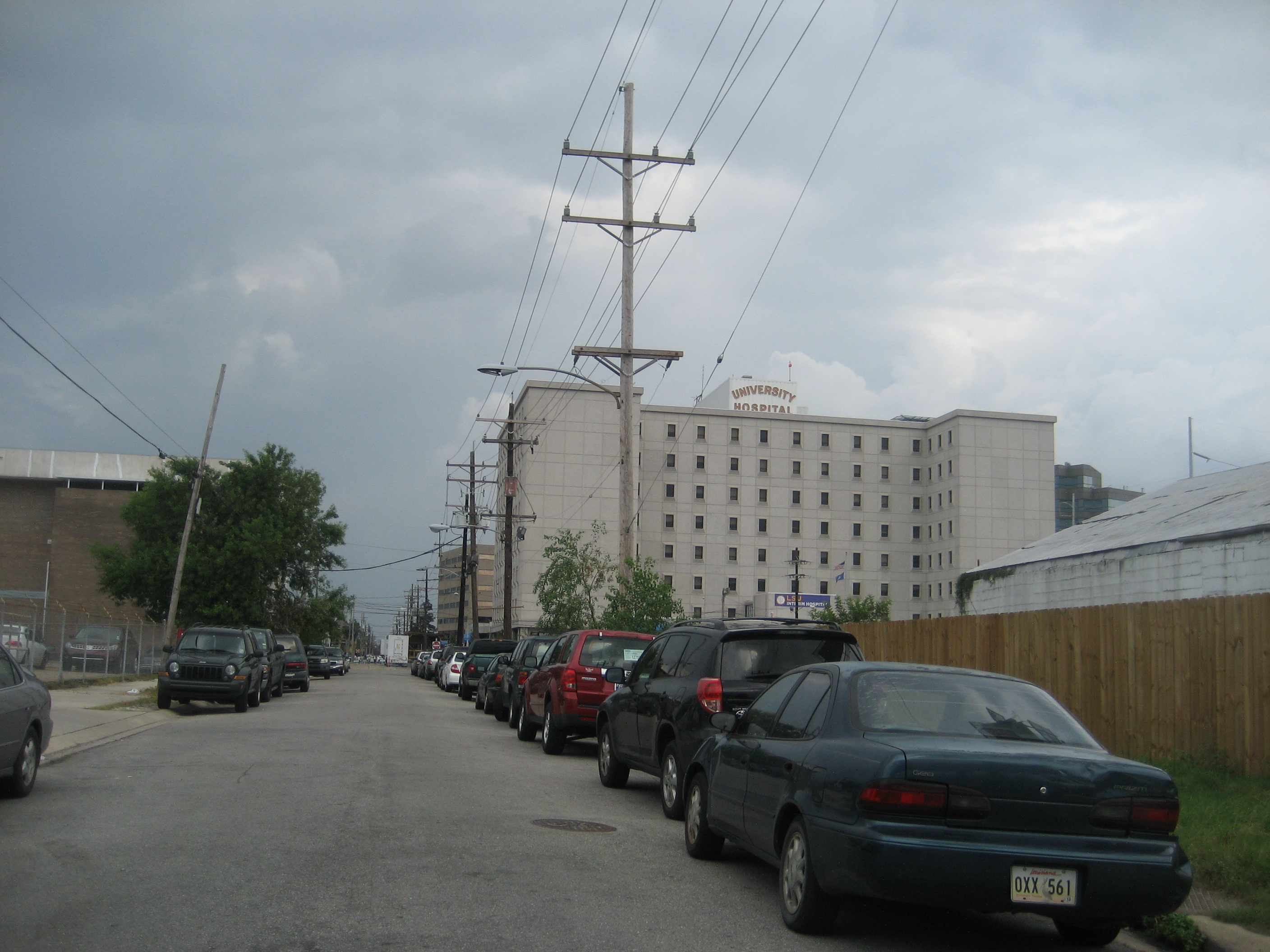
- Interim LSU Hospital, New Orleans

Geography
- Location: 2021 Perdido St., New Orleans, Louisiana, United States

Organization
- Affiliated university: Louisiana State University School of Medicine, Tulane University School of Medicine

Services
- Beds: 386

History
- Founded: 1859
- Closed: August 1, 2015

Links
- Lists: Hospitals in Louisiana

University Hospital, most recently called Interim LSU Hospital (ILH), was a teaching hospital located in New Orleans, Louisiana. It closed on August 1, 2015, when all patients were moved to University Medical Center New Orleans. University Hospital was previously a Catholic Hôtel-Dieu hospital.

== Organization ==
University Hospital was one of several teaching hospitals in the state of Louisiana administered by the Louisiana State University System.

In December 2012, it was announced that LSU Health Systems would transfer the management of ILH to Louisiana Children's Medical Center, a non-profit corporation that manages Children's Hospital and Touro Infirmary. The plan also called for LCMC Health to acquire University Medical Center Management Corporation (UMCMC), a non profit corporation originally established to manage and operate the University Medical Center, a $1.1 billion facility that opened on August 1, 2015. ILH's transition from public to private management took place in June 2013.

The hospital is located in the New Orleans Hospital District. It is adjacent to the LSU Health Sciences Center in New Orleans. The address is 2021 Perdido Street, New Orleans, Louisiana 70112–1352.

== History ==
University Hospital opened as Hôtel-Dieu (French for House of God) in 1859 and was operated by the Daughters of Charity. In 1913, it was the first hospital in the United States to have air conditioning in its surgical suites, and it was the site of milestone medical research that developed sulfonamide drug treatment for meningitis in the 1940s. The hospital developed a relationship with LSU Health Sciences Center in the 1970s and 1980s. It was purchased by the Louisiana State University System in 1991, renamed and converted into a teaching hospital for the adjacent medical school, which it also oversaw.

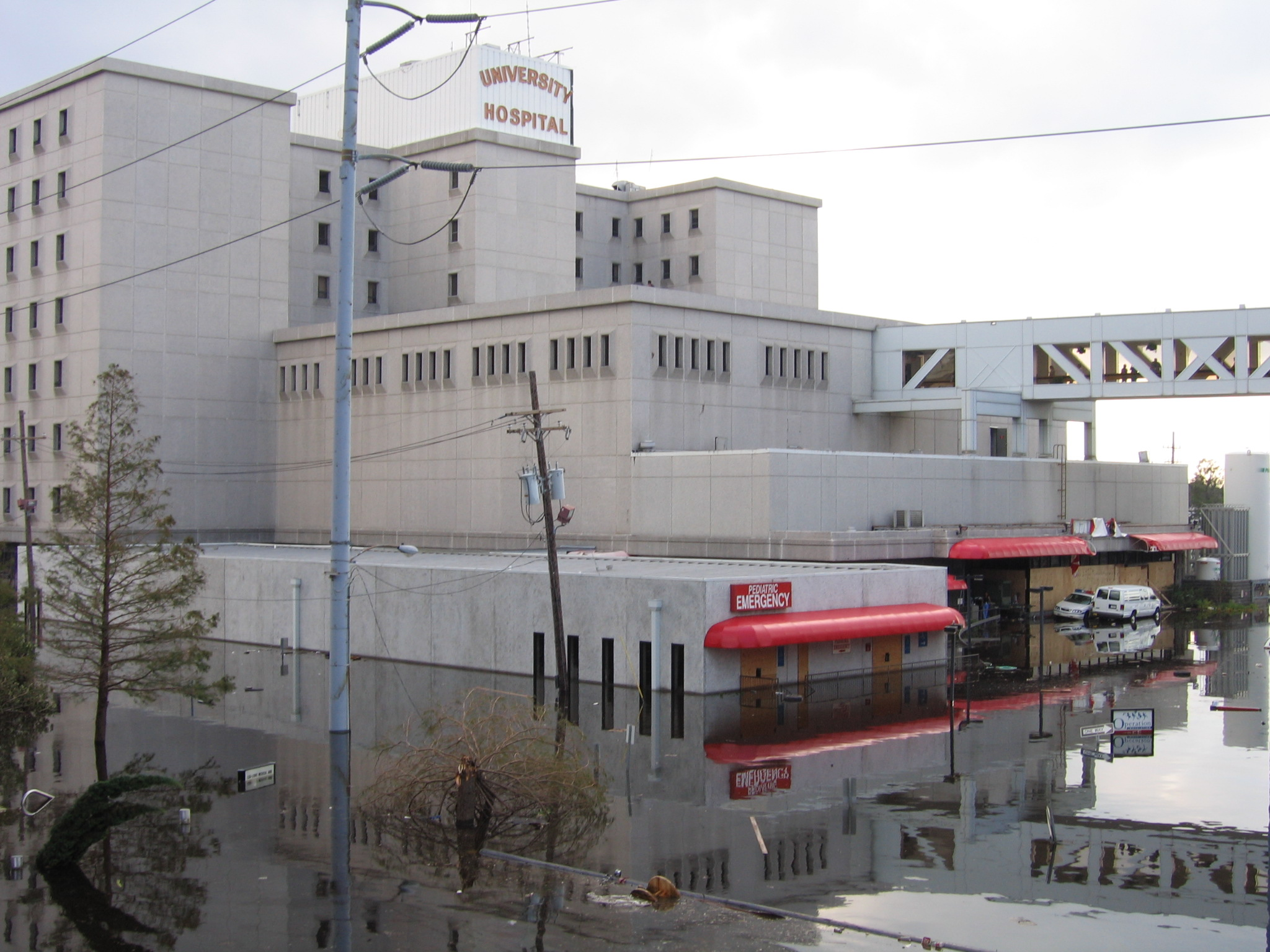
University Hospital in the flood waters from the levee failure disaster during Hurricane Katrina

In August 2005, like its sister hospital, Charity Hospital and most of the city, University Hospital sustained severe flood damage during Hurricane Katrina, and its patients were evacuated by boat and helicopter after the storm. In addition to the flood damage to the structure itself, the significant flooding caused the emergency generators to become submerged (as a result of being on the first floor), eventually becoming inundated with floodwater and failing. Another substantial impact caused by the overwhelming flood waters was the devastation to the sewage system. As those employed by the hospital attempted to successfully care for patients while dealing with limited supplies and manpower, the sewage system eventually failed, exposing all occupants of the hospital to potential diseases and illnesses. However, the hospital was extensively renovated and reopened November 20, 2006.

Although staff shortages and other limitations originally only allowed for a capacity of 85 out of 575 beds, the reopening was seen by many as a turning point for New Orleans, having had a severe shortage of emergency care since Katrina. In October 2009, University, with the closure of Charity Hospital, was designated the city's new Level I trauma center, named "Spirit of Charity", and alleviated West Jefferson Medical Center and East Jefferson General Hospital, which had been serving as the trauma centers up until then. As of 2014, the hospital is operating at 235 staffed beds.

The successor of Charity Hospital following Hurricane Katrina, Interim LSU Hospital was the main teaching hospital for LSU Health Sciences Center and was the only hospital in south Louisiana certified as a Level I Trauma Center by the American College of Surgeons.

Interim LSU Hospital was closed on August 1, 2015, with all patients and services being moved to the newly built University Medical Center New Orleans. The building then underwent extensive renovations, reopening in 2023 as the Center for Advanced Learning and Simulation (CALS), a training facility for the adjacent LSU Health Sciences Center - New Orleans.

== See also ==
- Hôtel-Dieu Other hospitals with this name in Canada and France
- Charity Hospital
- Louisiana State University System
- LSU Health Sciences Center New Orleans
- Medical Center of Louisiana at New Orleans
- Tulane University School of Medicine
- University Medical Center New Orleans
