= Edgar Hull =

American physician

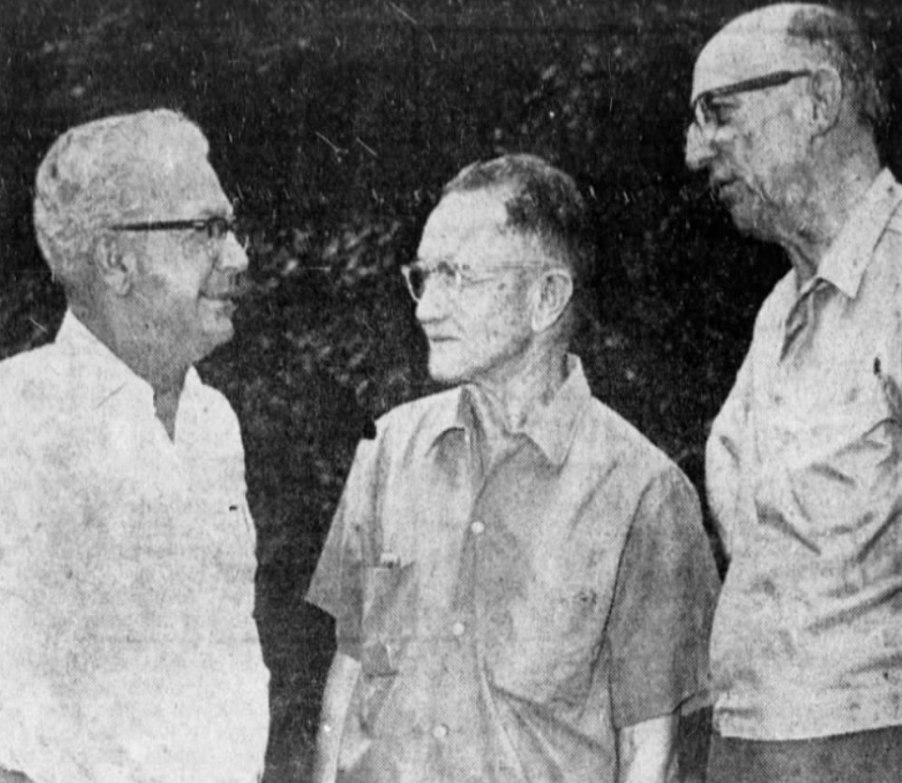
- Hull (center) with William W. Frye and Robert K. Womack, 1969
- Born: Edgar Hull Jr. February 20, 1904; Pascagoula, Mississippi, U.S.
- Died: October 25, 1984 (aged 80); Pascagoula, Mississippi, U.S.
- Education: Louisiana State University; Tulane University School of Medicine
- Occupations: Medical doctor; Hospital administrator
- Years active: 1927-1973
- Known for: Louisiana State University Medical Center in New Orleans (1931) and Louisiana State University Health Sciences Center Shreveport (1966)
- Notable work: LSU Medical Centers in New Orleans and Shreveport; Touro Infirmary; Southern Baptist Hospital, New Orleans

Edgar Hull Jr. (February 20, 1904 – October 25, 1984) was an American physician in Louisiana. He was part of the founding faculty of the Louisiana State University Medical Center in New Orleans, and later served as dean of the Louisiana State University School of Medicine at Shreveport (now LSU Health Shreveport).

Hull died on October 25, 1984, in Pascagoula, Mississippi, at the age of 80, and was interred at Greenwood Cemetery in New Orleans.
