= Lakeview Hospital =

Lakeview Hospital may refer to:

- Lakeview Hospital, Derry in northern Ireland
- Lakeview Hospital (Utah) in Bountiful, Utah, USA
- Lakeview Regional Medical Center in Saint Tammany Parish, Louisiana, USA
