= LCMC =

LCMC may refer to:

- Lutheran Congregations in Mission for Christ
- Life Cycle Management Command, subordinate commands within the United States Army Materiel Command
- LCMC Health, (Louisiana Children's Medical Center), New Orleans, United States
- Latur Municipal Corporation, Maharashtra, India
- Lehigh Coal Mining Company, subsidiary of Lehigh Coal & Navigation Company in Pennsylvania, United States
