= Abraham Louis Levin =

Physician and medical innovator

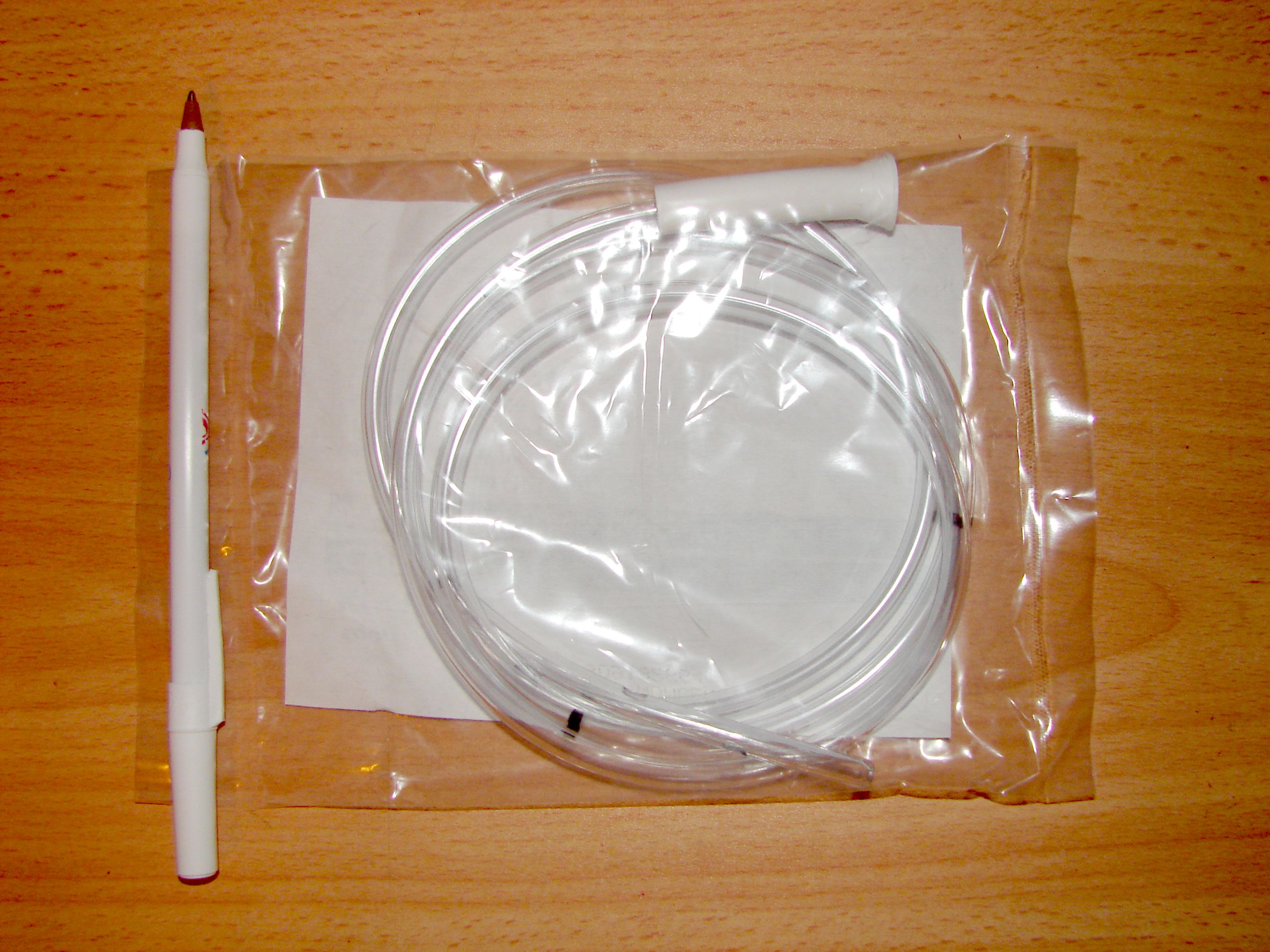
Nasogastric tube (Levin type)

Abraham Louis Levin (December 16, 1880 – September 15, 1940) was an American physician and the inventor of the Levin Tube, which is still widely used for duodenal drainage after surgery and for management of trauma patients. This procedure is known as nasogastric intubation.

Levin was born in Suwałki, Poland (née Levitansky). He emigrated with his family to New Orleans, Louisiana, in 1902. He graduated from Blinn Memorial College in 1903 and subsequently earned his MD degree from Tulane University School of Medicine in 1907. Levin completed post-graduate training in internal medicine and gastroenterology at Johns Hopkins University. He spent most of his career as a practicing physician at Touro Infirmary of New Orleans.

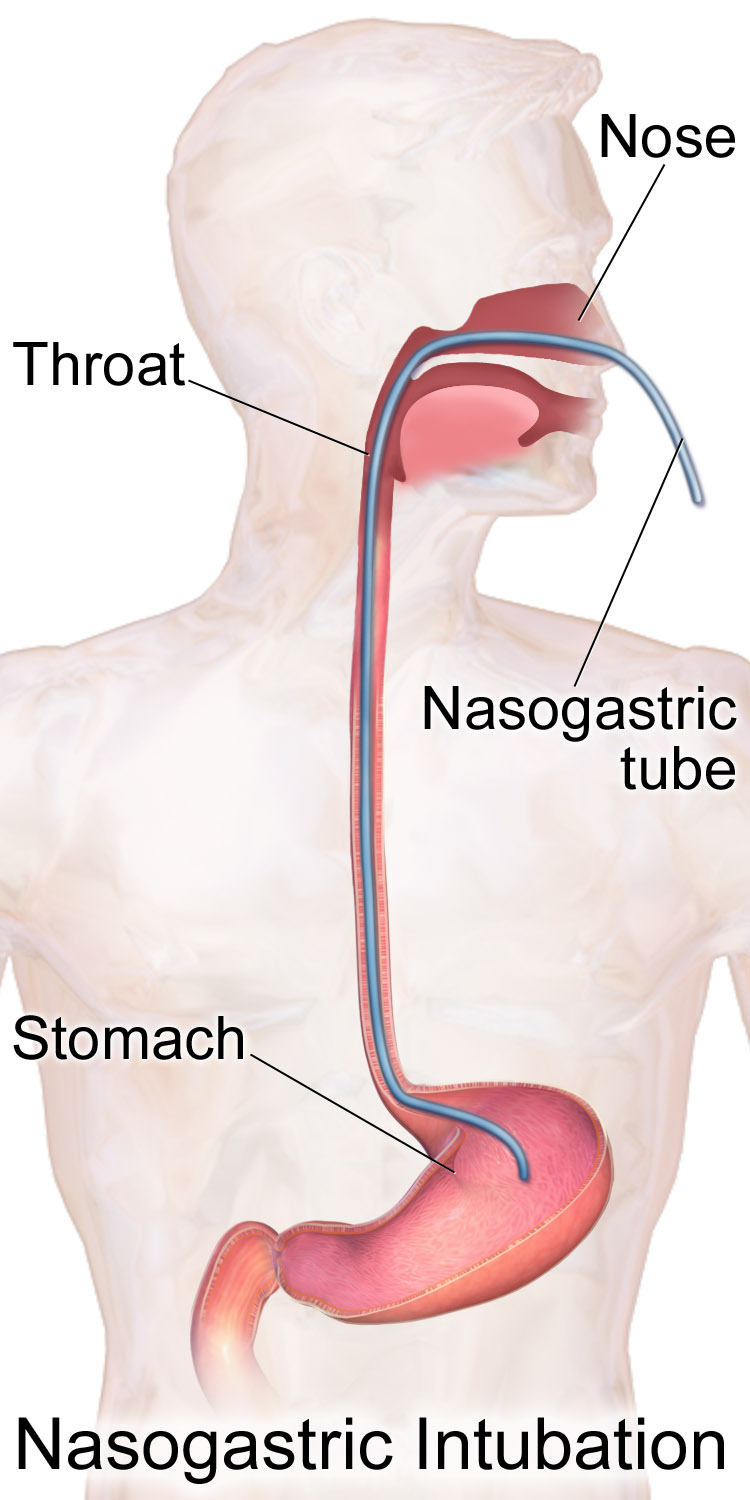
Use of the Levin tube in nasogastric intubation

In addition to his private practice of medicine, Levin served in the US Army Medical Corps in World War I at Camp Beauregard in Louisiana. Levin treated large numbers of trauma patients with gastrointestinal involvement during his military duty. This was a period of extensive investigation into the diagnosis and treatment of gastrointestinal diseases in the medical community. Levin first published on his invention in 1921. Initially, Levin envisioned diagnostic uses of his nasogastric drainage device, such as for gallbladder disease. His 1927 publication anticipated the modern use of the invention for gastric decompression resulting from abdominal distention.

Levin died on September 15, 1940. An annual Levin Memorial Address was established at Louisiana State University School of Medicine, and a Levin Memorial Award for the outstanding medical intern was established at Touro Infirmary. Levin's cousin Samuel A. Levine (note the difference in spelling) is credited with defining the Levine's sign, used in cardiology.
