= Manning Family Children's =

- LCMC Health System

Geography
- Location: New Orleans, Louisiana, United States
- Coordinates: 29.917848°N 90.127879°W

Organization
- Type: Teaching
- Affiliated university: LSU Health Sciences Center New Orleans

Services
- Emergency department: Level I Pediatric Trauma Center
- Beds: 263
- Speciality: Children's hospital

Helipads
- Helipad: FAA LID: LA93

History
- Opened: 1955

Links
- Website: www.manningchildrens.org
- Lists: Hospitals in Louisiana

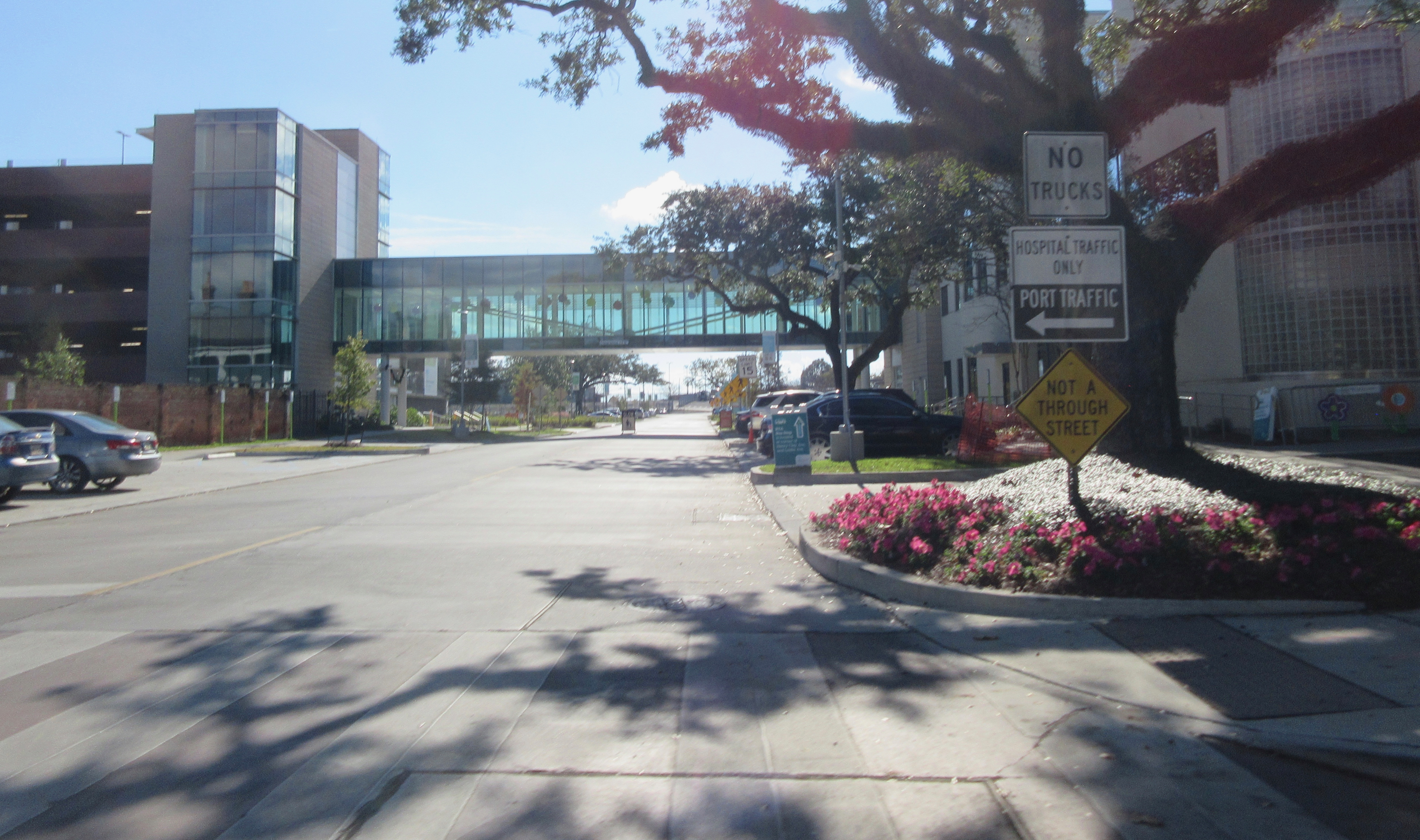
Children's Hospital in 2022

Manning Family Children's formerly known as Children's Hospital of New Orleans is a non-profit, pediatric acute care children's teaching hospital located in New Orleans, Louisiana. The hospital has 229 pediatric beds and is affiliated with the Louisiana State University Health Sciences Center. The hospital is a member of LCMC Health and is the only children's hospital in the network. The hospital provides comprehensive pediatric specialties and subspecialties to infants, children, teens, and young adults aged 0–21 throughout New Orleans and the state of Louisiana. CHNOLA also sometimes treats adults that require pediatric care. CHNOLA also features the largest pediatric emergency department in the region and is the largest provider of pediatric health services in Louisiana.

Children's Hospital offers a wide range of inpatient and outpatient pediatric care, including a Pediatric intensive care unit, Neonatal intensive care unit, and a parenting education center. The hospital admits over 7,000 inpatient and 170,000 outpatient visits each year. The hospital services the entire state of Louisiana and Gulf Coast region.

== History ==
Children's Hospital is operated as a non-profit organization, run by an independent board of trustees. It was originally opened as a rehabilitation center for physically handicapped children in 1955 under the name Crippled Children's Hospital. The facility was expanded into a full-service hospital and given the name Children's Hospital of New Orleans in 1976.

In 2007, Children's Hospital acquired the former campus of DePaul Hospital a few blocks to its north and renamed it the Calhoun Campus.

In 2014, Children's Hospital acquired the immediately adjacent campus of the former New Orleans U.S. Marine Hospital. At the time the historic buildings were in poor condition after years of neglect, and the hospital renovated most of them as administrative and physicians' offices and a conference center, a Hogs House Family Center, and a Ronald McDonald House. An old plantation house was restored to its 1850s appearance and was put into use as a coffeehouse; it was renamed Hales Cottage in honor of Marine Hospital pediatrician and Children's Hospital board member Stephen Hales and his wife Nancy Hales.

During the hospital's 70th anniversary celebration on February 5, 2025, it was announced that its new name would be Manning Family Children's.

== About ==
The main hospital is located in the University District of Uptown New Orleans. This facility is located along the levee next to the Mississippi River, near the Audubon Zoo and Audubon Park, New Orleans, on the city's old high ground or "sliver by the river" which escaped the flooding of most of the city in the Levee failures in Greater New Orleans, 2005 in the aftermath of Hurricane Katrina. There is also a satellite clinic in the nearby suburb of Metairie and one in Baton Rouge. The hospital has its own power generator and remained operational throughout Hurricane Katrina. Though the hospital received no damage, officials were concerned about the lack of clean water and electricity in the New Orleans area. It was evacuated on September 1, 2005 when the hospital lost water pressure from the city. Children from the hospital were sent to children's hospitals around the U.S. and Canada. The hospital suffered no flood damage and negligible wind damage during the storm. It was fully reopened over a month later on October 10, 2005.

Children's Hospital and Touro Infirmary merged into one hospital system in 2009. Louisiana Children's Medical Center, the parent of Children's Hospital, became the parent to both. Louisiana Children's Medical Center was later renamed LCMC Health.

== See also ==
- List of children's hospitals
