= Lakeview Regional Medical Center =

Lakeview Hospital
- LCMC Health
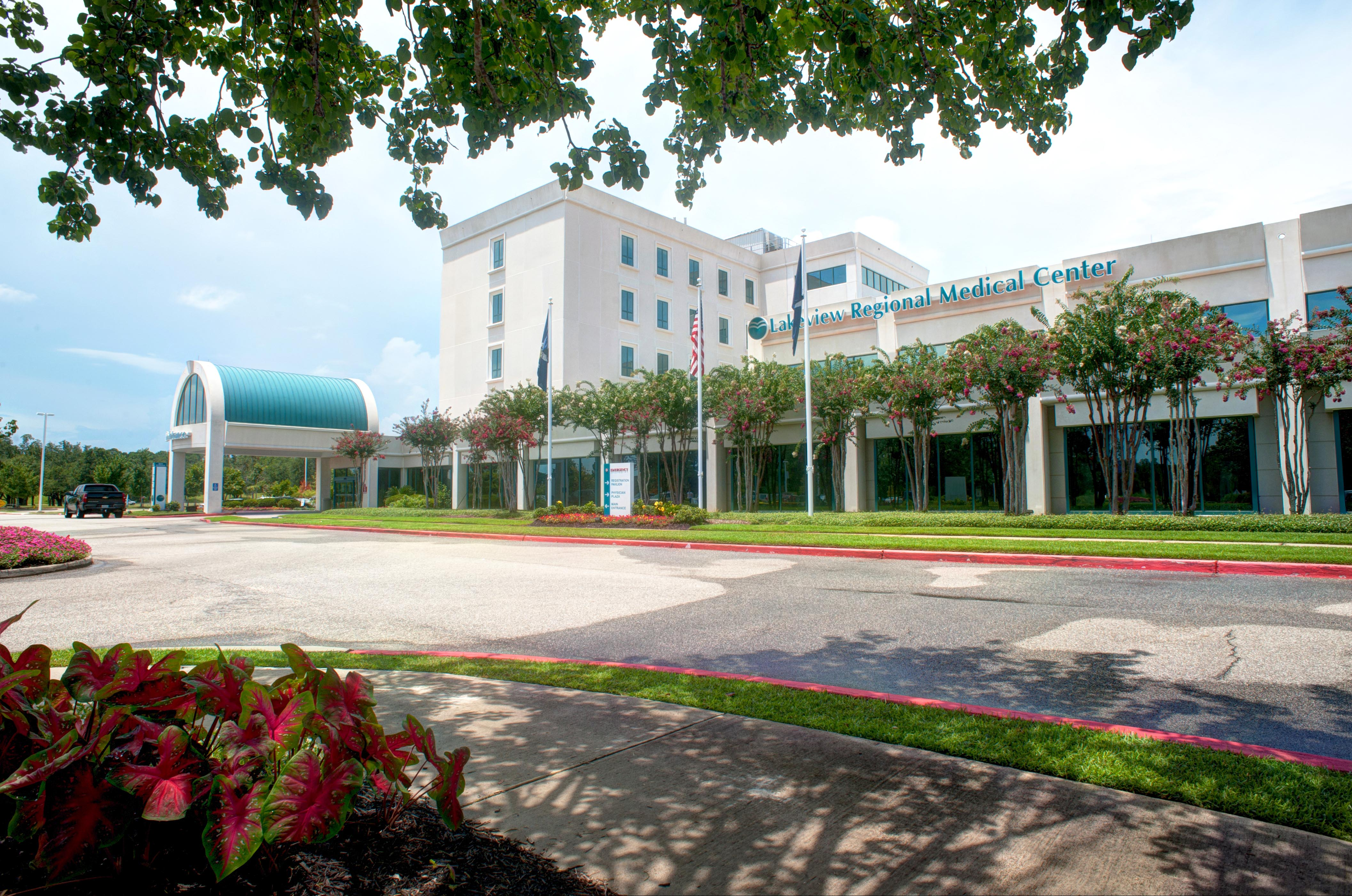
- The front of Lakeview Hospital

Geography
- Location: Covington, Louisiana, United States
- Coordinates: 30.41107°N 90.08075°W

Services
- Emergency department: Trauma center
- Beds: 167

Links
- Website: www.lcmchealth.org/lakeview-hospital/
- Lists: Hospitals in Louisiana

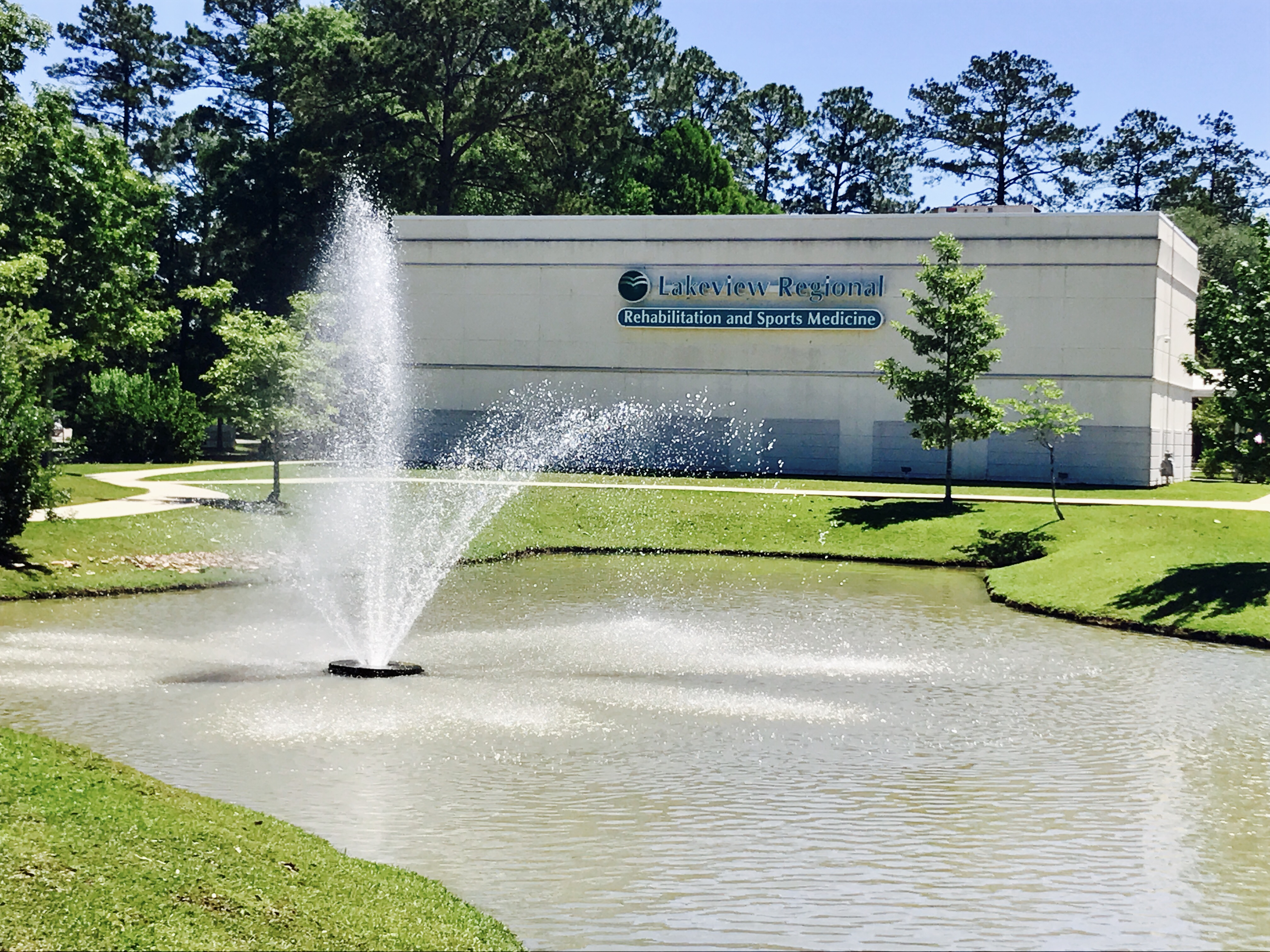
Rehabilitation and Sports Medicine centers at Lakeview Hospital.

Lakeview Hospital, is now a part of LCMC Health. Lakeview Hospital is located in Covington, Louisiana and offers advanced medical care to residents of St. Tammany parish, including Lacombe, Covington, Madisonville, Abita Springs and Mandeville. The hospital and emergency room serves Louisiana's Northshore region. Since 1993, the hospital has been a transforming and healing presence in the community as a full-service, acute care hospital providing inpatient and outpatient healthcare services. With its 167 beds, more than 240 physicians and specialists and 800 employees, Lakeview Hospital offers a full spectrum of services, including a 24/7 Emergency Room, a Heart Center, a Surgical Institute, a Rehabilitation Center and a Behavioral Health Center. Other services provided at this campus include bone and joint care, imaging, spine care services; stroke care, surgical and vascular care; robotic surgeries; and women's and infant services, among others. Lakeview Hospital continues to reinvest in its facilities and staff to better meet the needs of the growing community, as well as provide the latest in medical innovations in diagnostic and treatment services and state-of-the-art medical equipment.

Tulane University and LCMC announced on October 10, 2022, that LCMC would purchase Tulane Medical Center (along with Lakeview Regional Medical Center, and Tulane Lakeside Hospital) from HCA for $150 Million.
