= Tulane–Lakeside Hospital =

Hospital in Louisiana, United States

Coordinates: 29.99673°N 90.18665°W

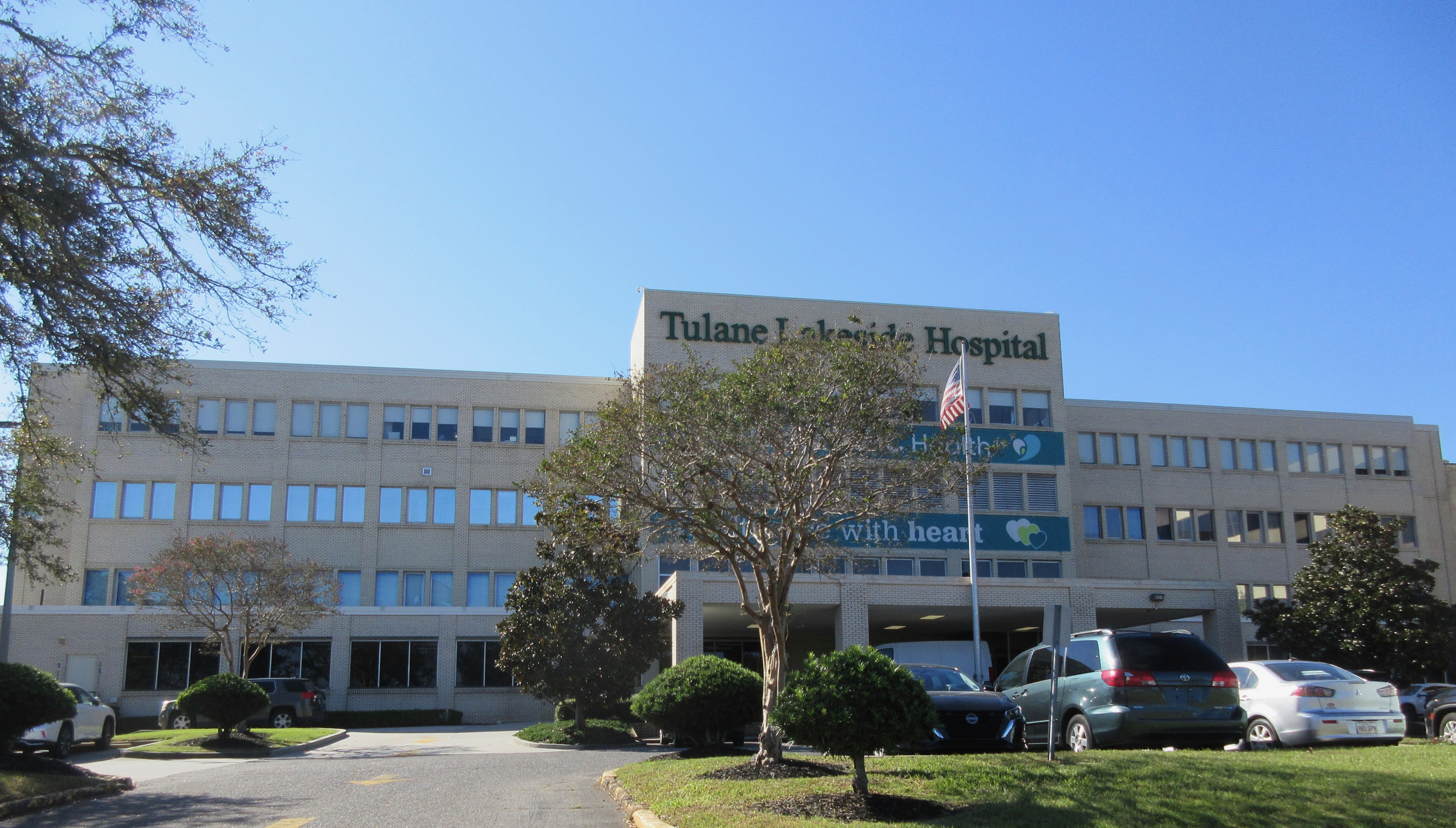
Tulane Lakeside Hospital in 2024

Tulane–Lakeside Hospital is a 121-bedded hospital in Metairie, Louisiana that specializes in woman's health services. Since its opening in 1964, the hospital has delivered over 1,000,000 babies and treated over 300,000 patients. It is a part of Tulane Medical Center. Tulane University and LCMC announced on October 10, 2022 that LCMC would purchase Tulane Medical Center (along with Lakeview Regional Medical Center, and Tulane Lakeside Hospital) from HCA for $150 Million.
