= Touro Infirmary =

Non-profit hospital in New Orleans, Louisiana

- LCMC Health System

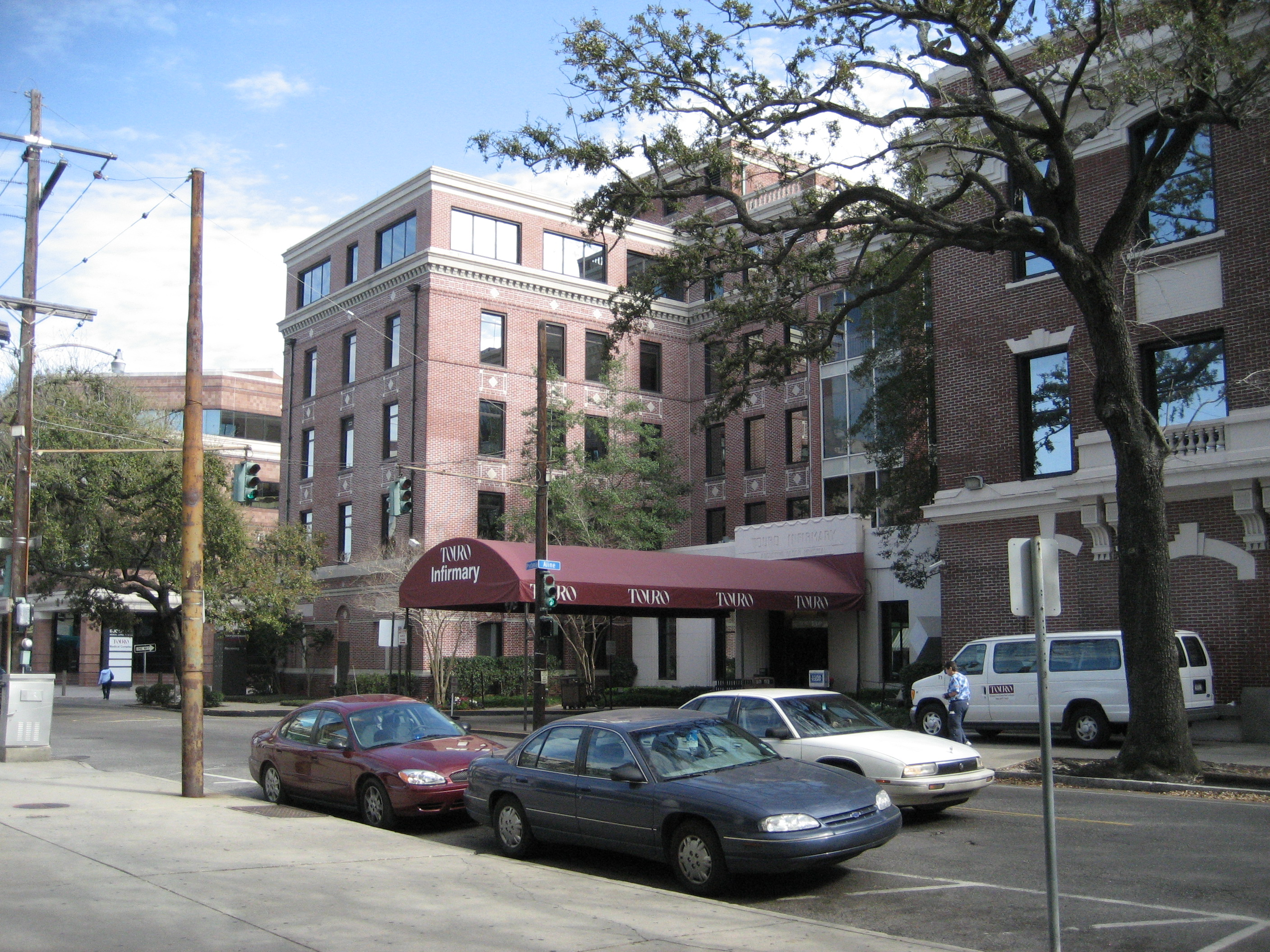
- Prytania Street entrance of Touro Infirmary

Geography
- Location: 1401 Foucher St., New Orleans, Louisiana, United States
- Coordinates: 29.925841°N 90.092261°W

Organization
- Network: LCMC Health System

History
- Opened: 1852

Links
- Website: www.lcmchealth.org/touro/
- Lists: Hospitals in Louisiana

Touro Infirmary is a non-profit hospital located in New Orleans, Louisiana. Founded by Judah Touro in 1852, it is a part of the LCMC Health System.

== Organization ==
Touro Infirmary is affiliated with the Louisiana State University Health Science Center and Tulane University School of Medicine.

The hospital has been located in Uptown New Orleans, within the historic Garden District since 1911. It is near the intersection of Louisiana Avenue and Prytania Street. The address is 1401 Foucher Street, New Orleans with entrances on Foucher Street and Prytania Street.

== History ==
Touro Infirmary was founded in 1852 by an endowment from Judah Touro. Edward Haycock, Sr., of Shrewsbury, Shropshire, England won first prize for his plans for the building.

Touro is best known for its Family Birthing Center and for founding the first rehabilitation program in New Orleans. It is also known for its cancer, diabetes, and heart disease programs. Its Neuroscience Center is one of the most advanced in the city.

Notable physicians who worked at Touro included Drs. Alton Ochsner, Edgar Hull, Abraham Louis Levin, and Rudolph Matas. Notable patients have included jazz musician Muggsy Spanier, who composed his tune "Relaxin' at the Touro" while recovering from an operation there. Touro was also the birthplace of writer Truman Capote (September 30, 1924), and opera stars Norman Treigle (March 6, 1927) and Shirley Verrett (May 31, 1931).

It was also notable for being the only full-service, adult hospital open in Orleans Parish in the immediate aftermath of Hurricane Katrina. The building suffered minor damage during Katrina, but had many ceiling tiles ripped off and mold on furniture that was later replaced. The hospital reopened on September 28, 2005.

== See also ==
- List of the oldest hospitals in the United States
- Children's Hospital of New Orleans
- List of hospitals in Louisiana
