= Tulane Medical Center =

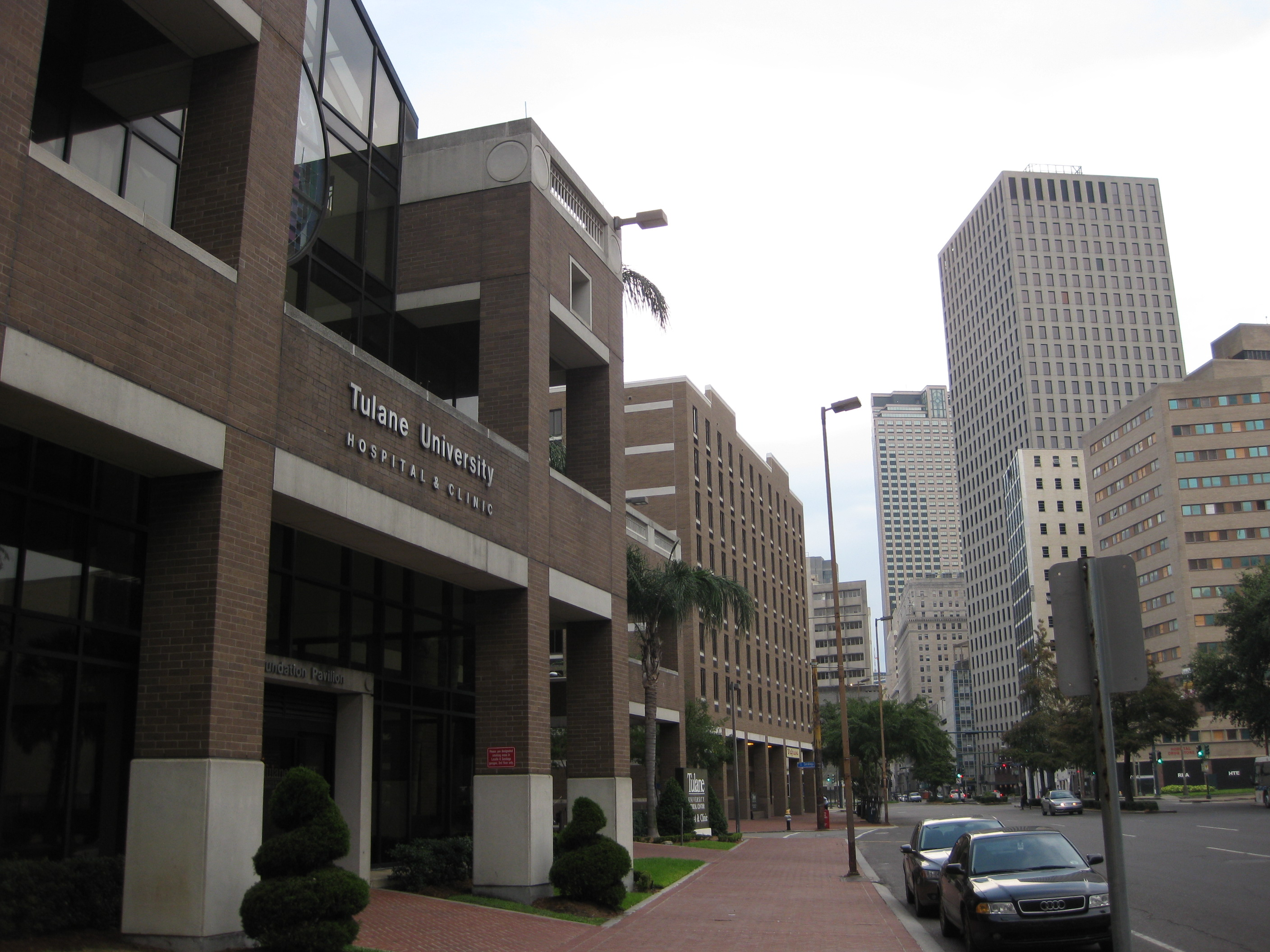

Geography
- Location: New Orleans, Louisiana, United States
- Coordinates: 29.955658°N 90.075884°W

Organization
- Care system: Private
- Type: Teaching
- Affiliated university: Tulane University

Services
- Beds: 235

History
- Founded: 1976

Links
- Website: tulanehealthcare.com
- Lists: Hospitals in Louisiana

The Tulane Medical Center is an Emergency Department located in New Orleans, Louisiana. The Tulane Medical Center has centers and clinics covering nearly all major specialties of medicine, and is the primary teaching hospital for the Tulane University School of Medicine. The hospital is jointly owned by LCMC Health and Tulane University (17.5%). Tulane University and LCMC announced on October 10, 2022, that LCMC would purchase Tulane Medical Center (along with Lakeview Hospital and Lakeside Hospital) from HCA for $150 Million.

== Centers ==
The Tulane Medical Center encompasses the Tulane University Hospital and Clinic, Tulane–Lakeside Hospital, Tulane Hospital for Children, Tulane Cancer Center, Tulane Abdominal Transplant at Tulane Medical Center, Tulane-Lakeside Women's Center, Tulane Multispecialty Center Metairie, Tulane Multispecialty Center uptown, Tulane Multispecialty Center Downtown, and the Tulane Institute for Sports Medicine. In 2017, Lakeview Hospital in Covington became a campus of Tulane Medical Center.

== History ==
The location of the Tulane Medical School was once the New Orleans Chinatown. The medical center traces its history to 1834, when the medical school now known as the Tulane University School of Medicine opened. The current hospital opened in 1976 as the Tulane University Hospital and Clinic, and was subsequently purchased by HCA in 1995. The Lakeside Hospital for Women merged with Tulane University Hospital and Clinic in 2005, and changed its name to Tulane-Lakeside Hospital.

Tulane University and LCMC announced on October 10, 2022, that LCMC would purchase Tulane Medical Center (along with Lakeview Regional Medical Center, and Tulane Lakeside Hospital) from HCA for $150 Million. LCMC plans to shift the majority of services provided at Tulane Medical Center to East Jefferson General Hospital and University Medical Center New Orleans over the next 12–24 months.
