= Medical Center of Louisiana at New Orleans =

Teaching hospital in the USA

Coordinates: 29.9606°N 90.0814°W

The Medical Center of Louisiana at New Orleans (MCLNO) was the name of two teaching hospitals in New Orleans, Louisiana, United States. Both hospitals were part of the LSU Health Sciences Center in New Orleans commonly referred to as the LSU Medical School in New Orleans.

The two hospitals were Charity Hospital and University Hospital, which was later renamed Interim LSU Hospital (ILH). Charity Hospital was severely damaged by Hurricane Katrina and closed while Interim LSU Hospital (ILH) was extensively renovated and reopened November 20, 2006. A new facility named University Medical Center New Orleans opened on August 1, 2015, replacing both facilities.
