= University Medical Center New Orleans =

- LCMC Health

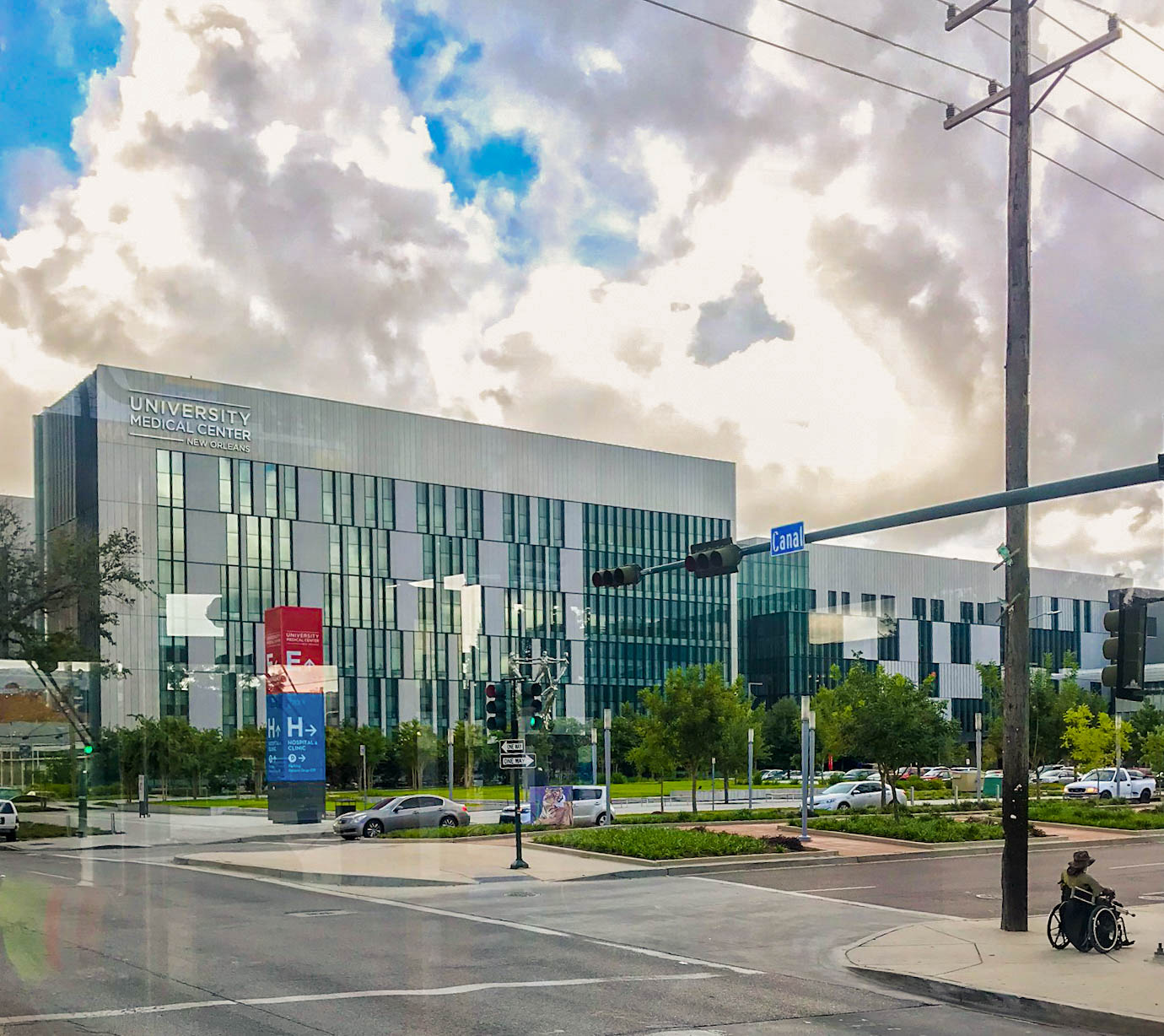
- University Medical Center New Orleans, August 2018

Geography
- Location: 2000 Canal Street, New Orleans, Louisiana, United States
- Coordinates: 29.96013°N 90.08194°W

Organization
- Care system: Private
- Type: General, Teaching
- Affiliated university: LSU Health Sciences Center New Orleans, Tulane University School of Medicine, University of Louisiana at Monroe, Delgado Community College, Dillard University, Our Lady of Holy Cross College, Southern University at New Orleans, Xavier University of Louisiana
- Network: LCMC Health

Services
- Emergency department: Level I trauma center
- Beds: 446

Helipads
- Helipad: FAA LID: LA58

History
- Founded: August 1, 2015

Links
- Website: http://www.umcno.org/
- Lists: Hospitals in Louisiana

University Medical Center New Orleans (UMCNO) is a 446-bed non-profit, public, research and academic hospital located in the Tulane - Gravier neighborhood of New Orleans, Louisiana, providing tertiary care for the southern Louisiana region and beyond. University Medical Center New Orleans is one of the region's only university-level academic medical centers. The hospital is operated by the LCMC Health System and is the largest hospital in the system. UMCNO is affiliated with the LSU Health Sciences Center New Orleans, Tulane University School of Medicine, University of Louisiana at Monroe, Delgado Community College, Dillard University, Our Lady of Holy Cross College, Southern University at New Orleans, and Xavier University of Louisiana. UMCNO is also an ACS designated level I trauma center and has a rooftop helipad to handle medevac patients.

== History ==
Ground was broken for the hospital on April 18, 2011. The design was a joint venture between NBBJ and Blitch Knevel Architects. The construction was managed by a joint venture between Skanska USA Building and MAPP Construction.

The $1.1 billion hospital opened on August 1, 2015, as a replacement for Charity Hospital and University Hospital. University Medical Center New Orleans is affiliated with the LSU Health Sciences Center New Orleans and Tulane University School of Medicine. The hospital is managed by LCMC Health, a private not-for-profit hospital system that held assets of $3.57 billion in 2022 and operated more than half of the hospitals in New Orleans.

== Facilities ==
The 213,677 square-meter (2.3 million square-foot) hospital features three patient towers with 446-acute care beds, including 60 behavioral health beds, 19 operating rooms, 76 pre-op and post-op bays, 56 emergency department exam rooms, nine acute treatment rooms and five trauma rooms. The facility is completely accredited by The Joint Commission (TJC).

The hospital is located on 15 hectares (37 acres), and critical areas are all situated at least 6.4 meters (21 feet) above base flood elevation. The facility also features emergency backup power and storm-resistant technology, which will enable it to withstand the impact of a Category 3 major hurricane.

== Labor relations ==
In December 2023, University Medical Center became the first private-sector hospital in Louisiana to unionize, after nurses at the hospital voted to join National Nurses United, the largest union of registered nurses in the US. Since unionizing, nurses at the hospital have gone on strike twice, in October 2024 and February 2025, with a third strike planned for May 2025.

== Gallery ==
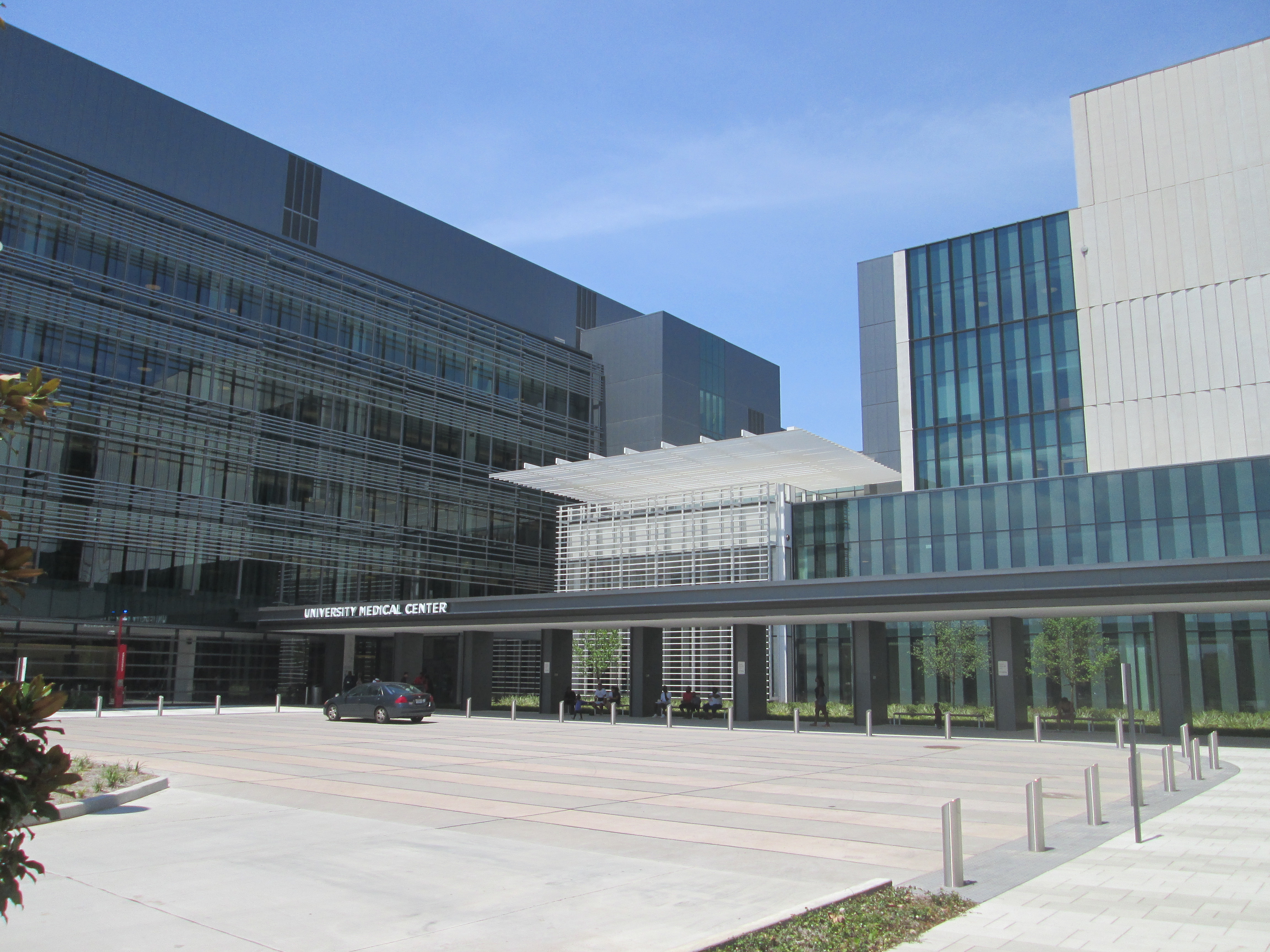
Main entrance to the new UMCNO.

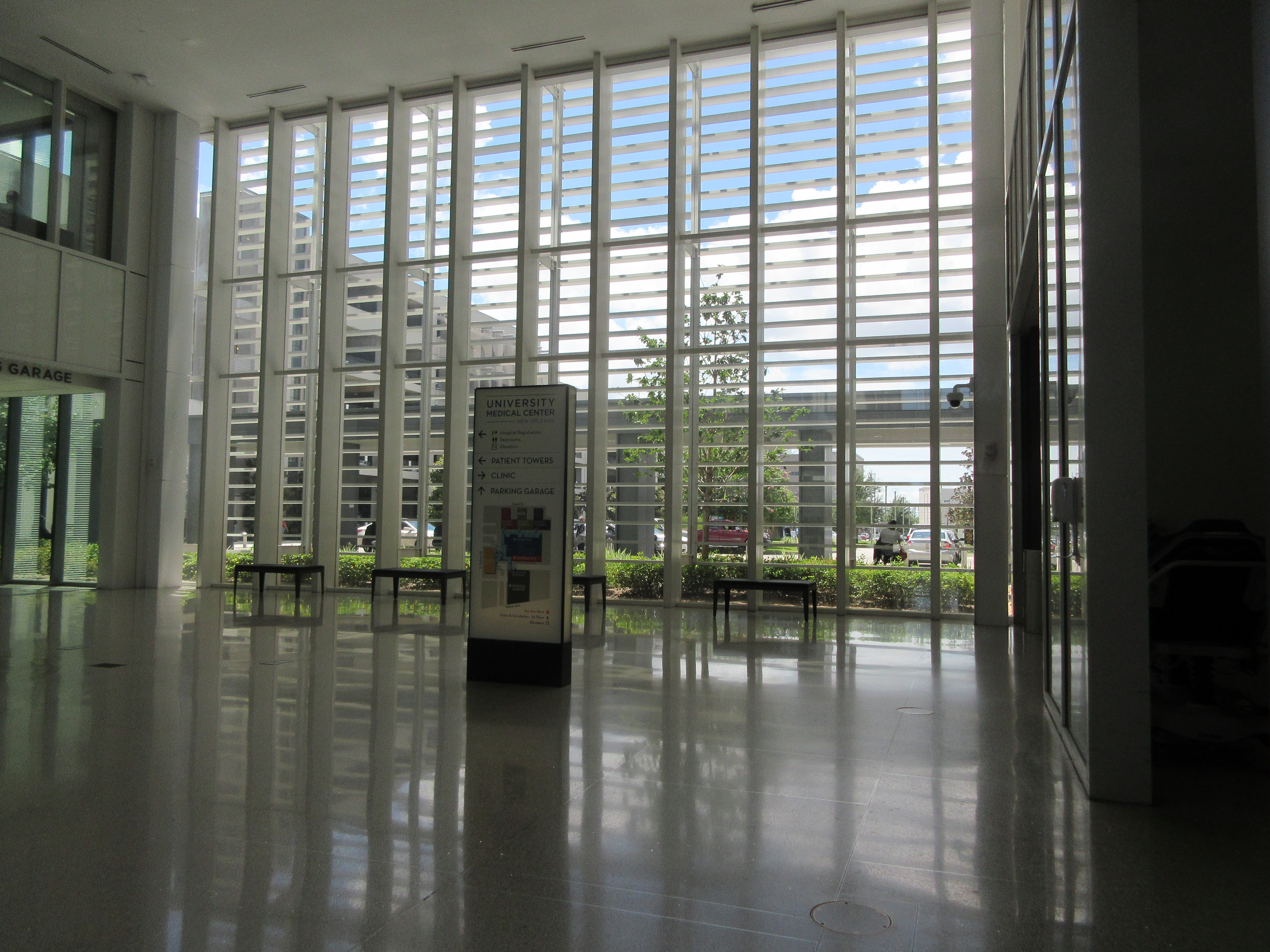
Inside the lobby.

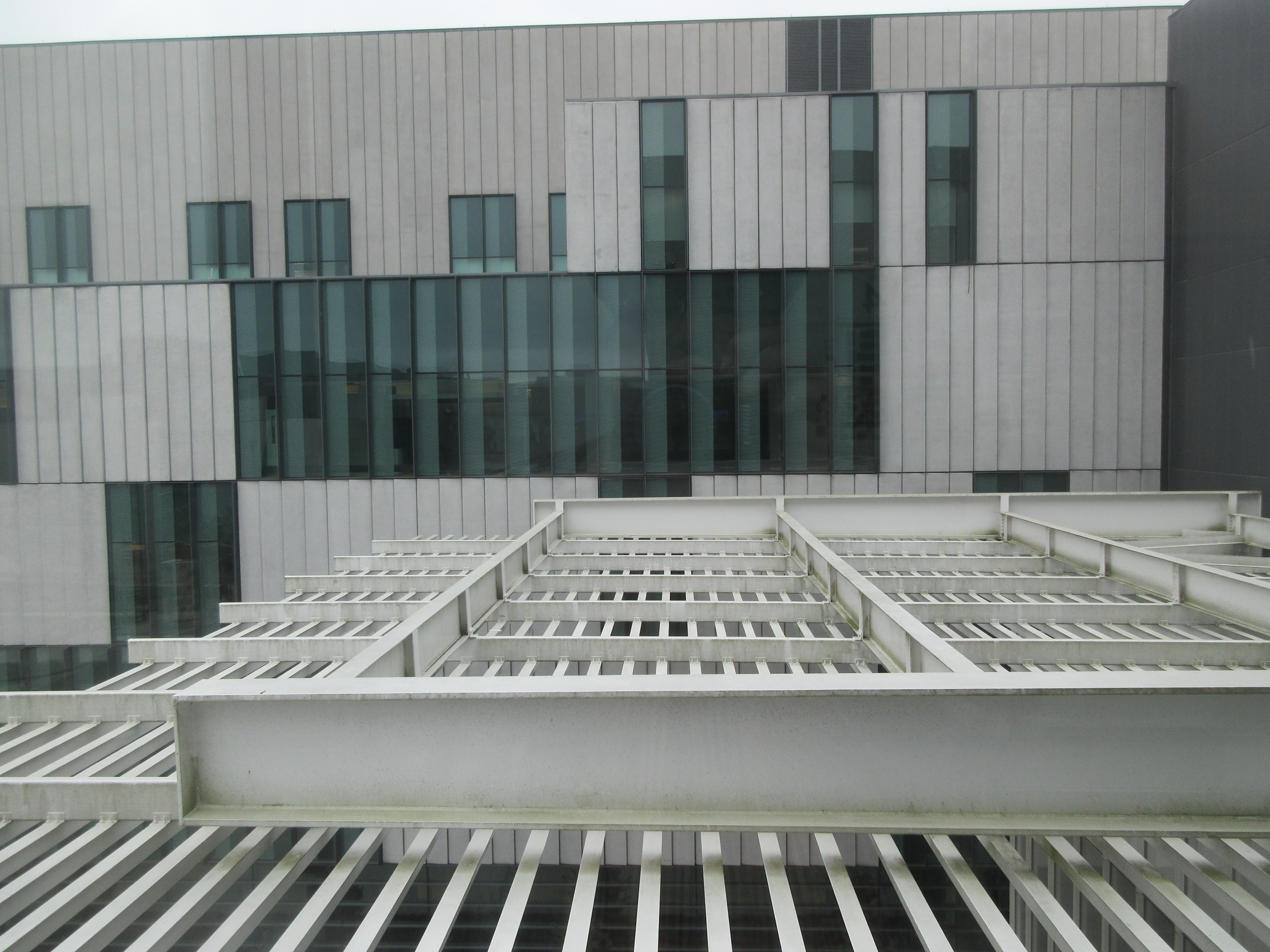
Detailing on roof.

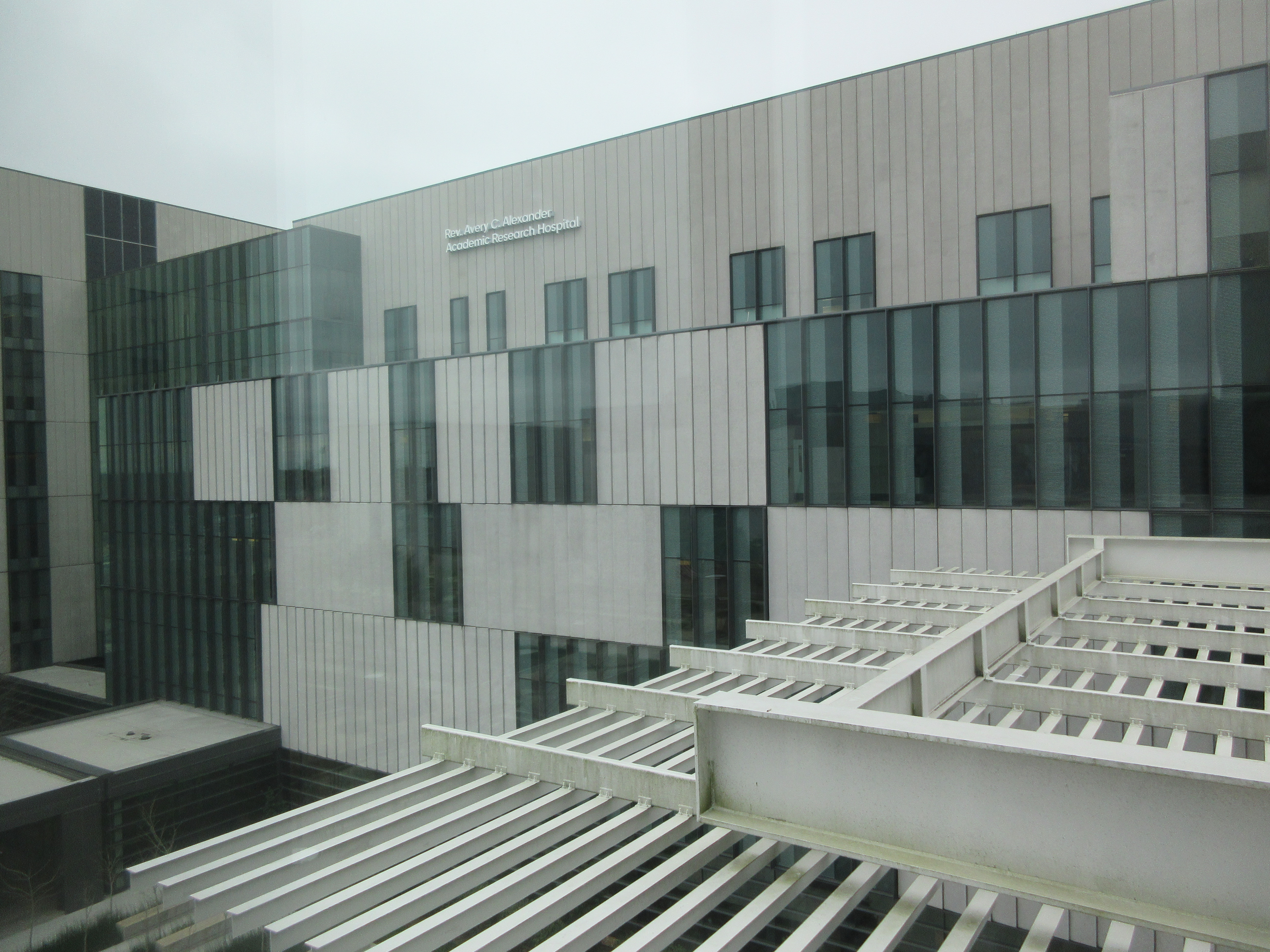

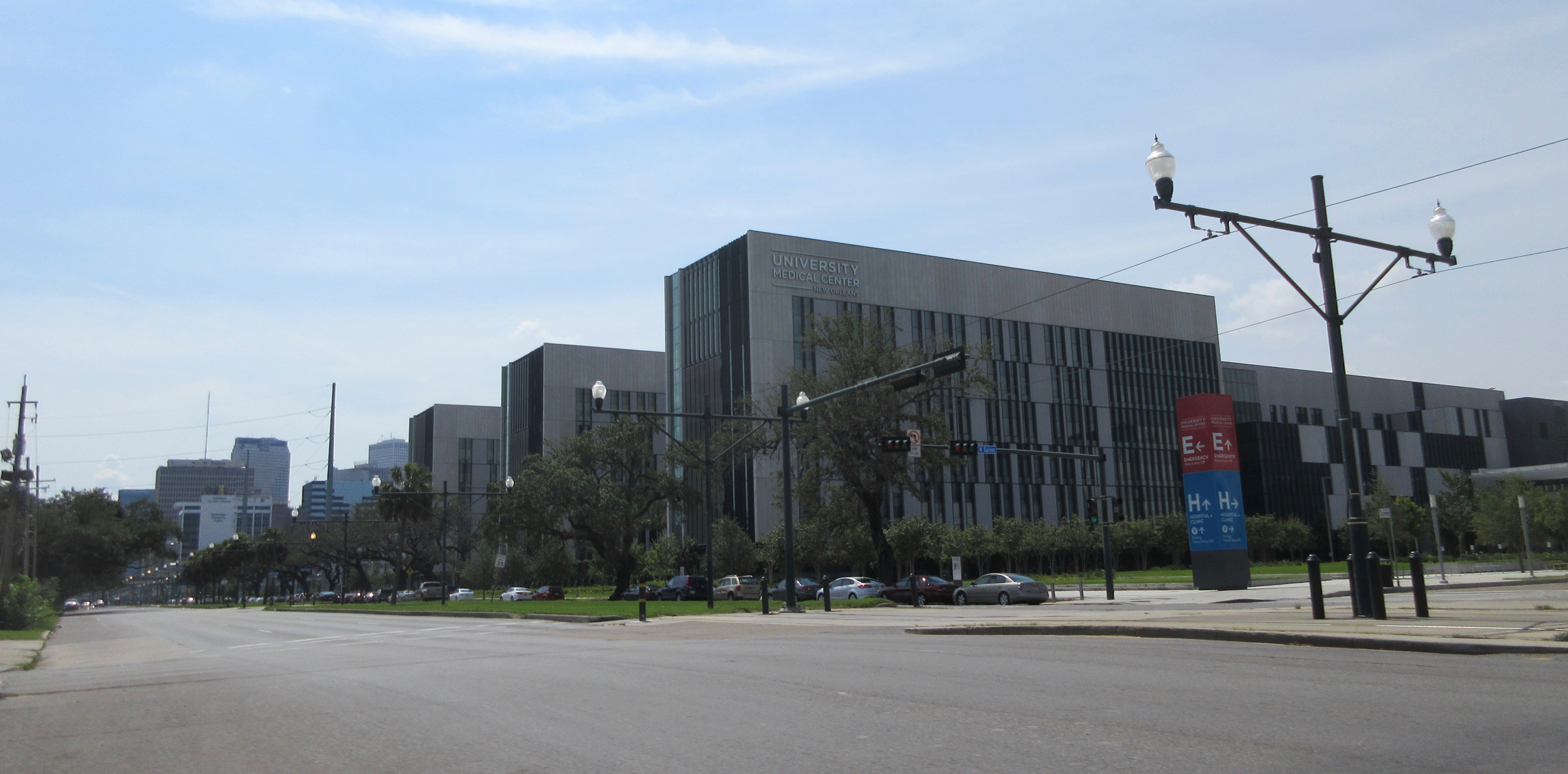

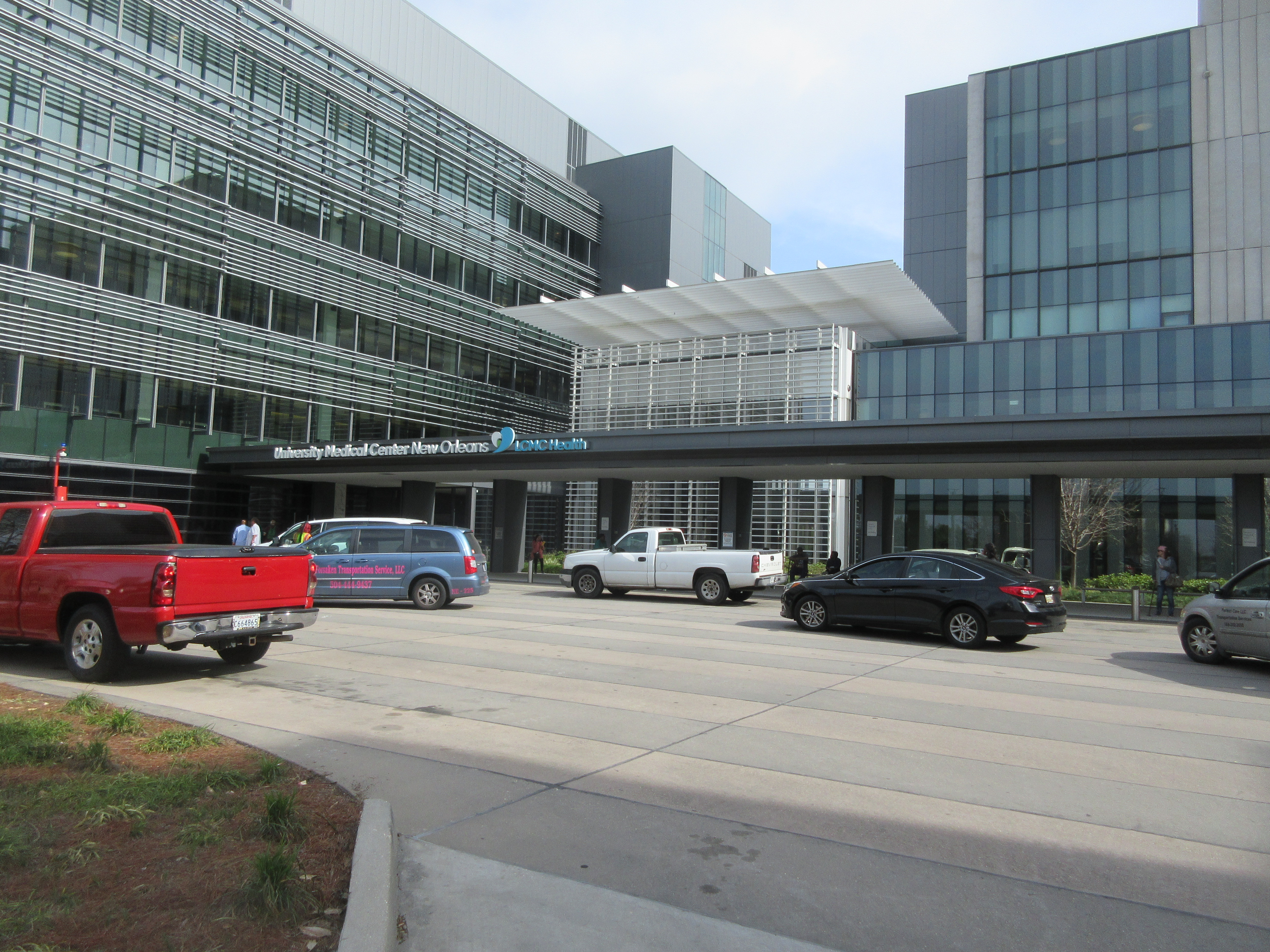

== See also ==
- List of hospitals in Louisiana
- LSU Health Sciences Center New Orleans
- Tulane University School of Medicine
- Charity Hospital
- University Hospital
