= Louisiana State University System =

Public university system in Louisiana

- Type: State university system
- Established: February 6, 1965; 61 years ago
- Endowment: $1.24 billion
- Chairman: Lee Mallet
- President: Wade Rousse
- Students: 57,000
- Location: 3810 West Lakeshore Drive, Baton Rouge, Louisiana, United States
- Website: lsu.edu

Louisiana State University System Locations.

The Louisiana State University System is a system of public colleges and universities in Louisiana. It is budgetarily the largest public university system in the state.

Wade Rousse is president of the LSU system and the chancellor of its flagship campus and namesake, Louisiana State University. Administrative headquarters are located in the University Administration Building on the property of Louisiana State University in Baton Rouge. The system had an endowment of $955.5 million in fiscal year 2020.

== Current Louisiana State University entities ==
=== Institutions ===
- Louisiana State University and Agricultural and Mechanical College (main campus in Baton Rouge; opened in 1860)
- Louisiana State University Agricultural Center - Baton Rouge (established 1972)
- Louisiana State University of Alexandria (opened 1960)
- Louisiana State University at Eunice (opened 1967)
- Louisiana State University Shreveport (opened 1967)
- LSU New Orleans (opened 1956)
- LSU Health New Orleans (established in 1931)
- LSU Health Shreveport (opened 1975)
- Paul M. Hebert Law Center - Baton Rouge (became separate institution in 1977)
- Pennington Biomedical Research Center - Baton Rouge

=== LSU Health Care Services Division ===
- Lallie Kemp Regional Medical Center, Independence.

=== Cooperative Extension Service ===
The LSU System has a presence in all 64 Louisiana parishes through its cooperative extension service. This service assists farmers, gardeners, and other businesses in dealing with some of Louisiana's unique environmental challenges.

=== LSU Online ===
The Louisiana State University system offers online degree programs through LSU Online. Online degrees are conferred from multiple campus institutions.

== See also ==
- List of colleges and universities in Louisiana
- List of hospitals in Louisiana
