= Charity Hospital (New Orleans) =

Abandoned hospital in New Orleans, Louisiana

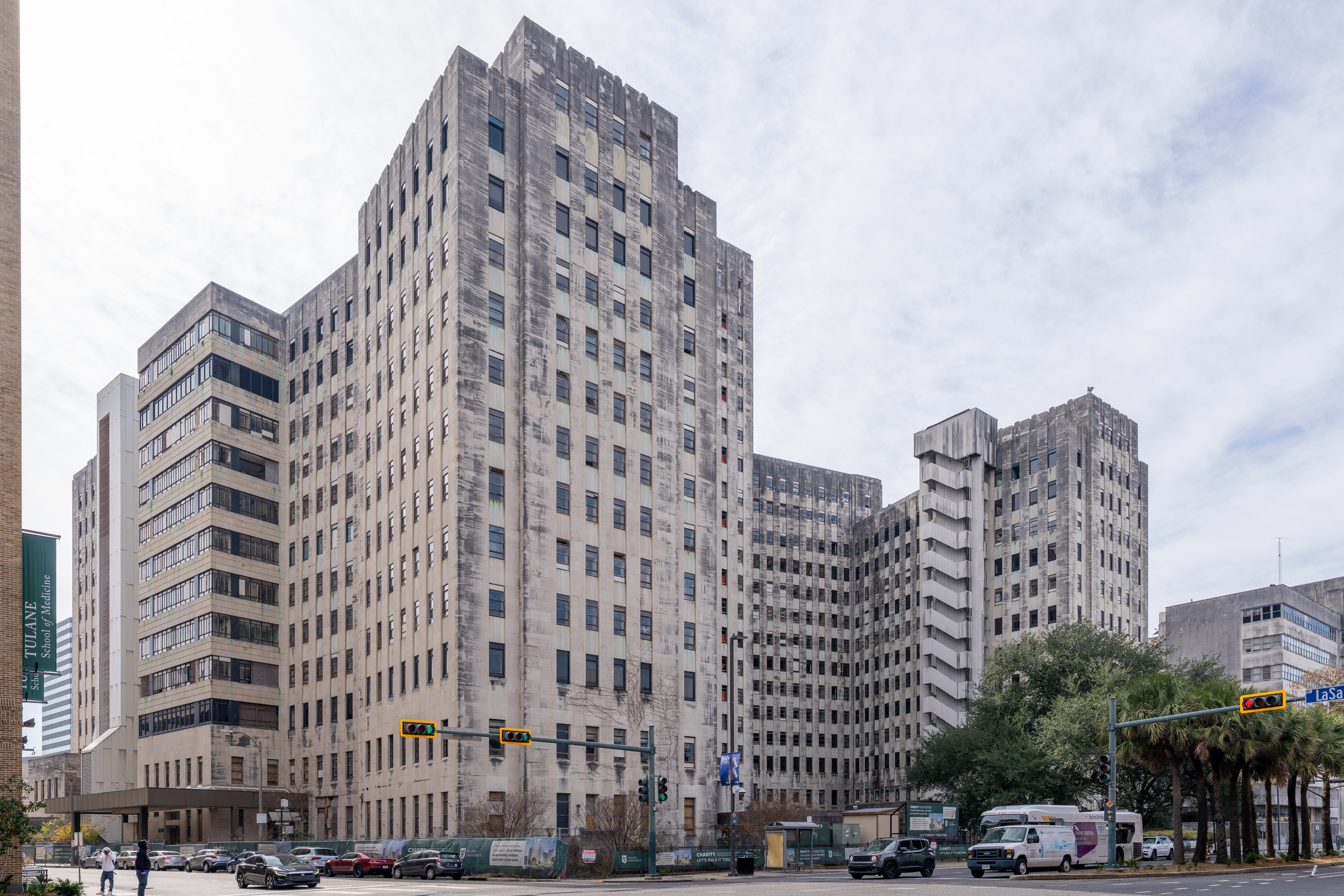
- The Charity Hospital building

Geography
- Location: 1532 Tulane Ave., New Orleans, Louisiana, United States
- Coordinates: 29.9554°N 90.0780°W

Organization
- Type: General, Teaching Hospital
- Affiliated university: Louisiana State University School of Medicine, Tulane University School of Medicine

Services
- Beds: 2,680

History
- Founded: May 10, 1736; 290 years ago
- Closed: August 2005

Links
- Lists: Hospitals in Louisiana

Charity Hospital was one of two teaching hospitals which were part of the Medical Center of Louisiana at New Orleans (MCLNO), the other being University Hospital. Three weeks after the events of Hurricane Katrina, then-Governor Kathleen Blanco said that Charity Hospital would not reopen as a functioning hospital. The Louisiana State University System, which owns the building, stated that it had no plans to reopen the hospital in its original location. It chose to incorporate Charity Hospital into the city's new medical center in the lower Mid-City neighborhood. The new hospital completed in August 2015 was named University Medical Center New Orleans.

== Organization ==
Charity Hospital was one of several public hospitals around the state of Louisiana administered by the Louisiana State University System at the time of Hurricane Katrina. Charity Hospital and the nearby University Hospital were both teaching hospitals affiliated with the LSU Health Sciences Center in New Orleans (LSUHSC-NO). University Hospital, later called Interim LSU Hospital, closed in 2015.

Prior to Katrina, Charity Hospital operated in the New Orleans Hospital District at 1532 Tulane Avenue, New Orleans, Louisiana 70112–1352. The building is approximately six-tenths of a mile on the opposite side of I-10 from Interim LSU Hospital.

== History ==
=== Early history ===
Charity Hospital was founded on May 10, 1736, by a grant from Jean Louis, a French sailor and shipbuilder, who died in New Orleans the year before. His last will and testament was to finance a hospital for the indigent in the colony of New Orleans from his estate.

Charity Hospital was originally named the Hospital of Saint John or L'Hôpital des Pauvres de la Charité (The Charity Hospital for the Poor). The first Charity Hospital was located on the intersection of Chartres Street and Bienville Street in what is now the French Quarter. The hospital was founded 18 years after the city was founded by France in 1718. It was the second oldest continuously operated public hospital in the United States. Only Bellevue Hospital in New York City is older, having been founded a month earlier, on March 31, 1736.

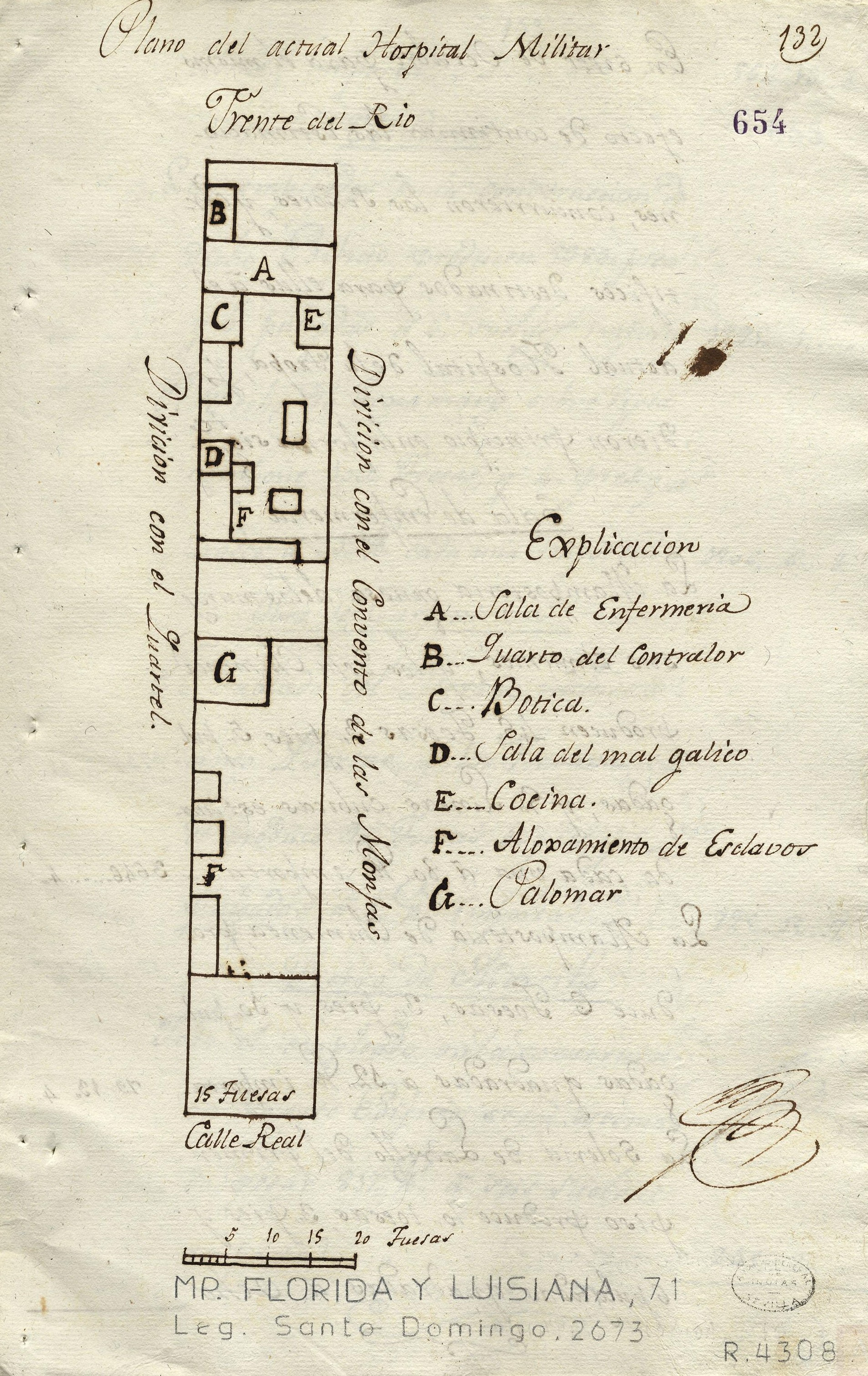
Plano del hospital militar en servicio en Nueva Orleans 1801

Charity Hospital quickly outgrew its original facility, and a second hospital was built at the edge of the colony on Basin Street in 1743. A third hospital was built nearby in 1785. It was renamed the San Carlos Hospital in honor of King Charles III, King of Spain, after New Orleans was ceded to Spain in 1763.

A fire destroyed this hospital in 1809. Without a building, a temporary hospital was established at the Cabildo for a month, then at the Jourdan residence in the Faubourg Marigny for six months, then the dilapidated De La Vergne plantation for five years while a fourth hospital was built. This new hospital was built at the edge of the city on Canal Street where The Roosevelt New Orleans Hotel is currently located. The hospital was completed in 1815, but this hospital was widely criticized as inadequate and underfunded.

=== Common Street building ===
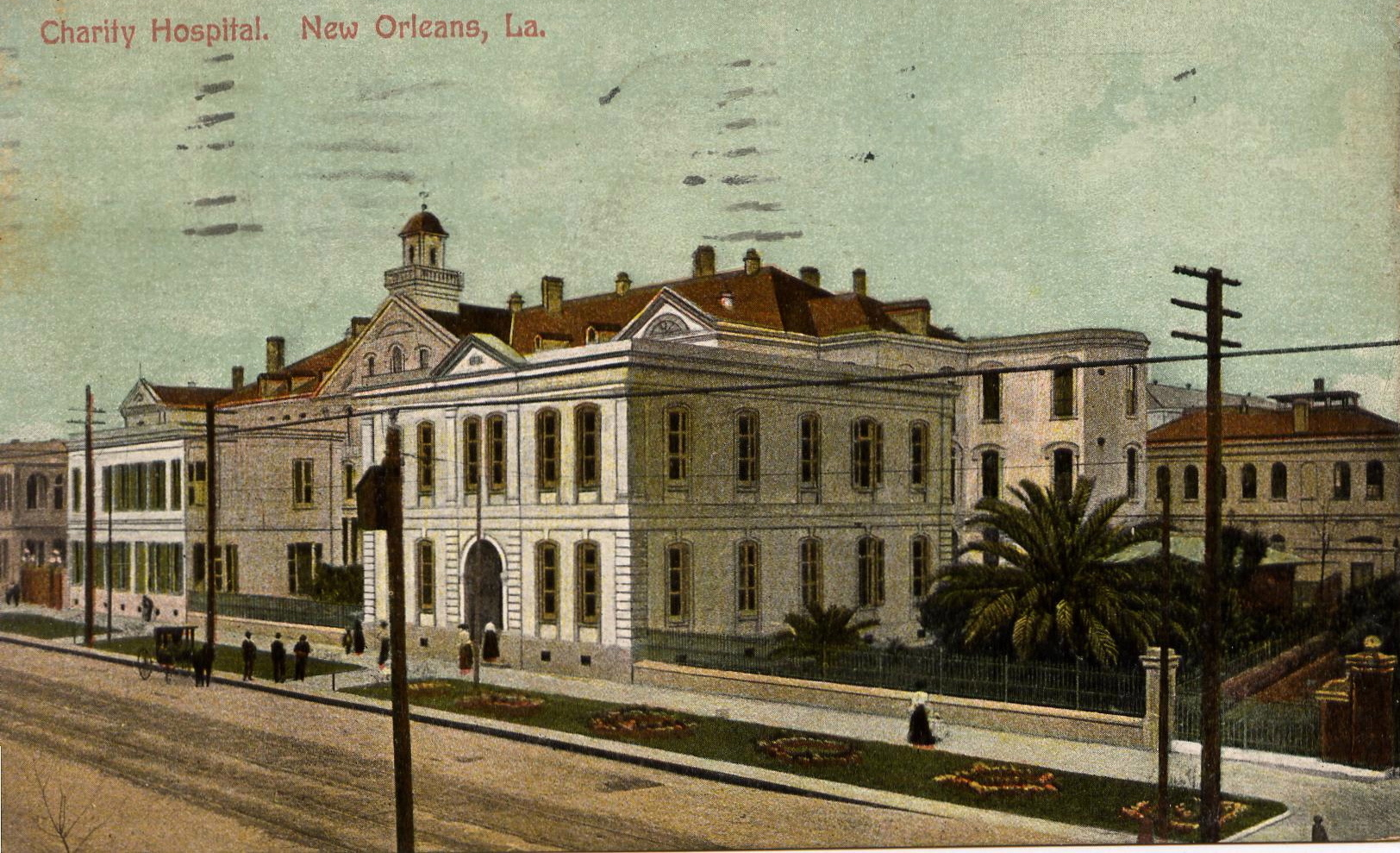
The old Charity Hospital building at the start of the 20th century

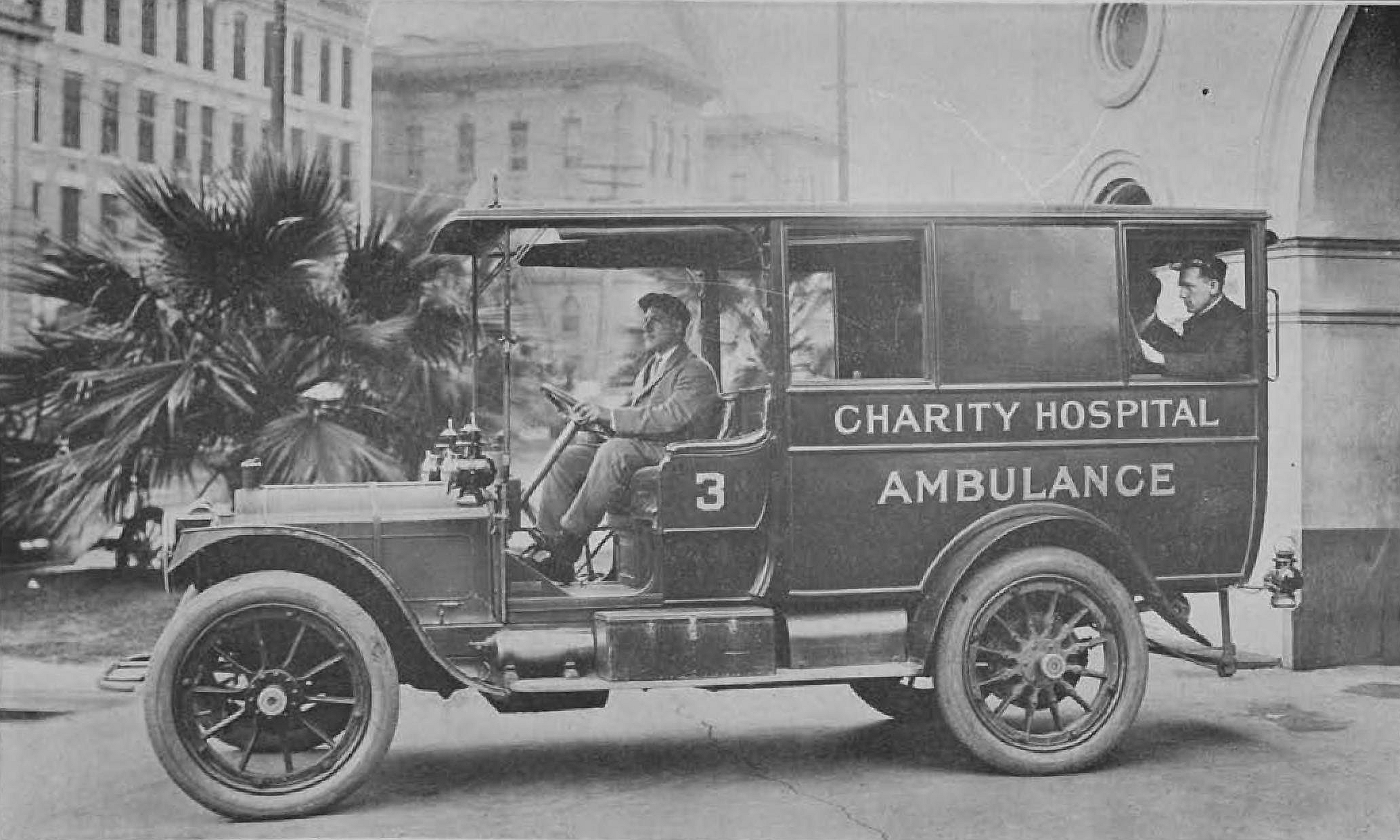
Ambulance, 1912

In 1832, a fifth hospital was built on Common Street (modern Tulane Avenue) between Howard Street (modern LaSalle Street), Robertson Street, and Gravier Street, on the edge of the Faubourg St. Marie. This hospital came under the administration of the Sisters of Charity in 1834, who would run the hospital for the next century.

In that year Charity also began its long history as a teaching hospital with the founding of The Medical College of Louisiana by three American physicians new to the city: Dr. Thomas Hunt, of South Carolina, Dr. Warren Stone, of Vermont, and Dr. John Harrison, of Washington, D.C., using various locations including Charity Hospital which was "open every day for the attendance of the students". In 1843 the college petitioned the Legislature for land to build a medical school building with the provision that the faculty would care for the patients of Charity free of charge for 10 years, a tradition which continued into the 1960s. In 1847 the Legislature established the University of Louisiana, and the Medical College of Louisiana was assumed into the school, becoming the Medical Department of the University of Louisiana. The hospital in the 1850s was probably the largest hospital in the world, with 1,000 beds, 200 more than the eminent Hotel Dieu in Paris. In 1884 Paul Tulane bequeathed the massive sum of $1.25 million dollars to establish the Tulane University of Louisiana, and the Medical Department of the University of Louisiana, until now state-supported, became part of the private Tulane University. In 1931 the Louisiana State University School of medicine was established on the grounds of the Charity complex along Tulane Avenue, on the opposite side from Tulane. When the sixth Charity was built in 1939, the new structure was in the shape of an H, modified to comply with the segregation laws of the time. Each wing belonged to Tulane or LSU's medical service. To divide incoming patients equally, patients with an even medical record number were assigned to one school, and those with an odd number to the other.

During the yellow fever epidemic of 1858, 2,727 patients were admitted and of them 1,382 died of the disease. Total patient admission that year was 11,337, being 9,135 males and 2,202 females.

=== Current building ===
By the 20th century, the city of New Orleans was rapidly expanding, and the demand for indigent medical services again exceeded Charity Hospital capacity. A sixth hospital was built on Tulane Avenue in 1939. At the time it was the second-largest hospital in the United States, with 2,680 beds. The mechanical engineer Karl von Terzaghi inspected the new structure and determined that it was sinking at a rate of 1 1/8 inches (2.9 cm) per year.

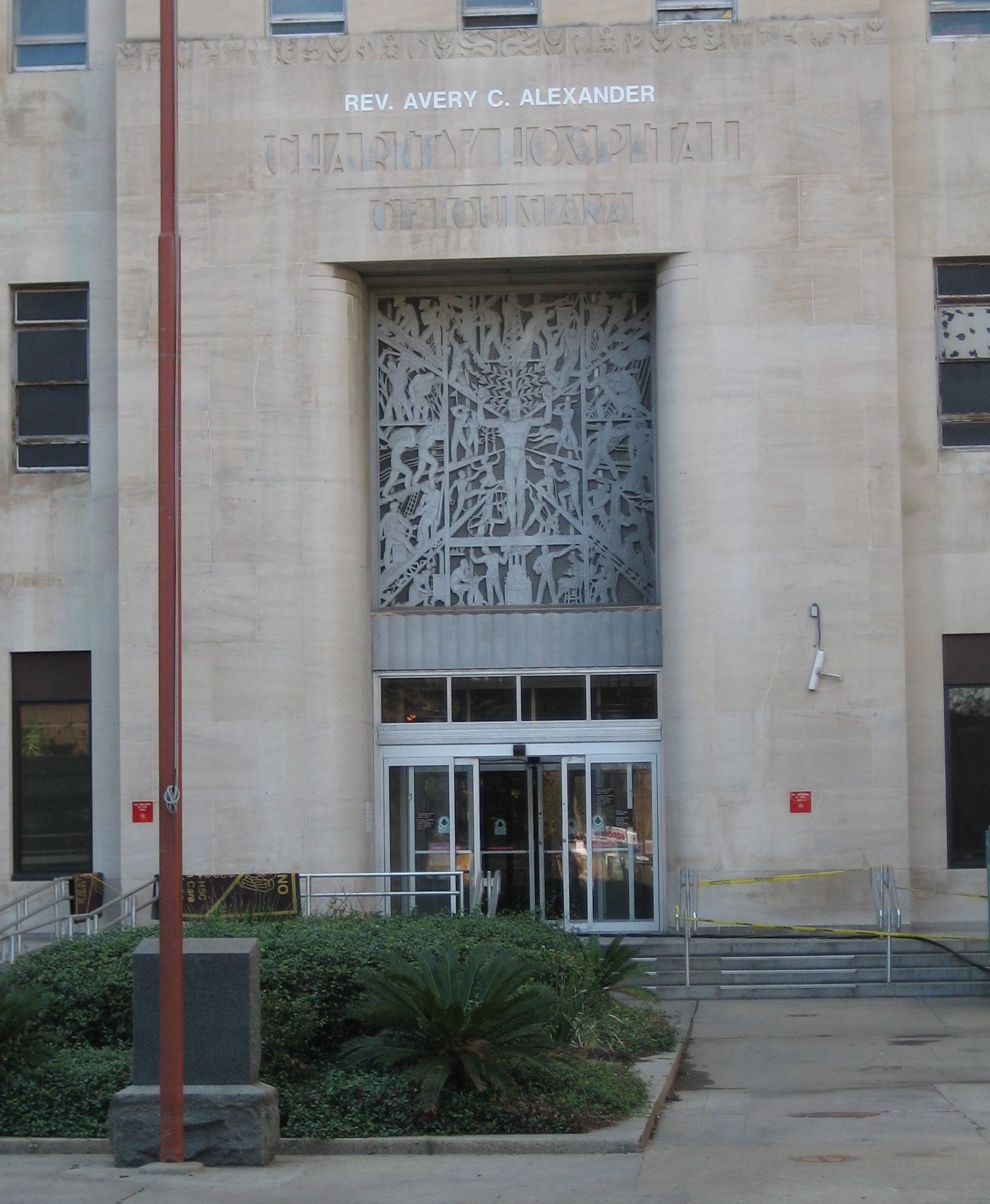
Main entry of Charity Hospital

The building's cornerstone lists the Federal Emergency Administration of Public Works (later called the Public Works Administration) as the building authority. The architects were Weiss, Dreyfous & Seiferth, who were also responsible for the Louisiana State Capitol in Baton Rouge. The hospital features two stone bas-reliefs and a cast-aluminum screen called Louisiana at Work and Play, all by artist Enrique Alférez.

The LSU Health Sciences Center in New Orleans (LSUHSC-NO) was built adjacent to Charity Hospital in 1931 under the aegis of Louisiana Governor Huey Pierce Long. Serving one of the largest populations of uninsured citizens, Charity Hospital also boasted the No. 2 Level I Trauma Center in the nation, with the No. 1 rank belonging to Cook County Hospital in Chicago, Illinois.

In 1968, the hospital lost a malpractice case before the U.S. Supreme Court. In Louise Levy, Administratrix v. Louisiana through the Charity Hospital of Louisiana at New Orleans Board of Administrators, et al., the court ruled that a child born out of wedlock could not be prevented from suing on behalf of a deceased parent.

The Louisiana Department of Health and Human Resources (DHH) took control of Charity Hospital in 1970. The hospital was transferred to the Louisiana Health Care Authority (LHCA) in 1991 and to the LSU System in 1997.

==== Hurricane Katrina ====
Like its sister hospital, University Hospital, Charity Hospital sustained severe flood damage during Hurricane Katrina in 2005. The evacuation of patients from the flooded hospital made national headlines, where patients had to be ferried out through high floodwaters and then be picked up by helicopter at the roof of Tulane hospital, as toilets backed up, essential supplies dwindled, and temperatures rose above 100 degrees. There were reports of hand pumped ventilators being used to breathe for patients and personnel using IV fluids to feed each other after food ran out. The evacuation was also halted by reports of sniper fire. A doctor was quoted as saying the smell was, "so bad it had many of us gagging and some people even threw up." Despite the ordeal, only eight patients died, mostly ICU patients, with more deaths occurring at other hospitals across the city, such as Lindy Boggs Medical Center and Memorial Medical Center.

After the storm, a temporary clinic named the Spirit of Charity was established at the Convention Center. The temporary Spirit of Charity Clinic was later relocated to the New Orleans Centre building adjacent to the Superdome. In February 2007, a renovated University Hospital had taken over interim responsibilities of emergency care to the city which Charity originally provided.

==== Attempts to re-develop the site ====
In 2012, the Foundation for Historical Louisiana hired the internationally renowned architectural firm, RMJM Hillier, to, "examine and evaluate the entire Big Charity structure to determine the advisability of repairing or restructuring the entire facility." RMJM Hillier determined the art deco building to be structurally sound—with its original design being architecturally exceptional and "ahead of its time." Rehabilitation into a 21st-century, state-of-the-art facility would be the fastest, most cost-effective way to return quality healthcare and a teaching hospital to New Orleans. This idea was scrubbed in favor of using University Hospital as an interim hospital and building University Medical Center New Orleans and a new Southeast Louisiana Veterans Health Care System Medical Center in the adjacent neighborhood of lower Mid-City. In August 2015, the LSU Health Sciences Center completed the new $1.1 billion medical center named University Medical Center New Orleans. The hospital consolidated the functions of both the already closed Charity Hospital and University Hospital.

In October 2019, LSU, the organization that has owned the structure since the 2005 evacuation and subsequent closure of the hospital, approved a re-development project to turn the former hospital into a mix of homes, retail space and other facilities. The redevelopment project had been long-awaited by city leaders hoping to revitalize the former "booming" central business district that has been suffering since the closure of Charity and surrounding buildings due to Hurricane Katrina. The contract was awarded to a group called 1532 Tulane Partners, a joint venture between New Orleans–based CCNO and Israeli development company El-Ad Group. Work was expected to begin on the giant building in Fall 2019 and construction was predicted to take three years. The redevelopment project was expected to cost $300 million that would have been partly funded by tax credits, and the building would not have been subject to property tax as the building will still be owned by LSU. The structure was projected to include about 390 residential units plus retail shops and restaurants. Tulane University was expected to serve as the main tenant of the building as they will use it for student housing and offices.

The 1532 Tulane Partners project was stalled by the global COVID-19 pandemic and other factors, but in February 2025, Tulane University announced via its Murphy Institute website that it "remains committed" to the plan of redeveloping and reopening the building as an expansion and/or relocation of various campus facilities, with a 2027 date of completion expected.

== In popular culture ==
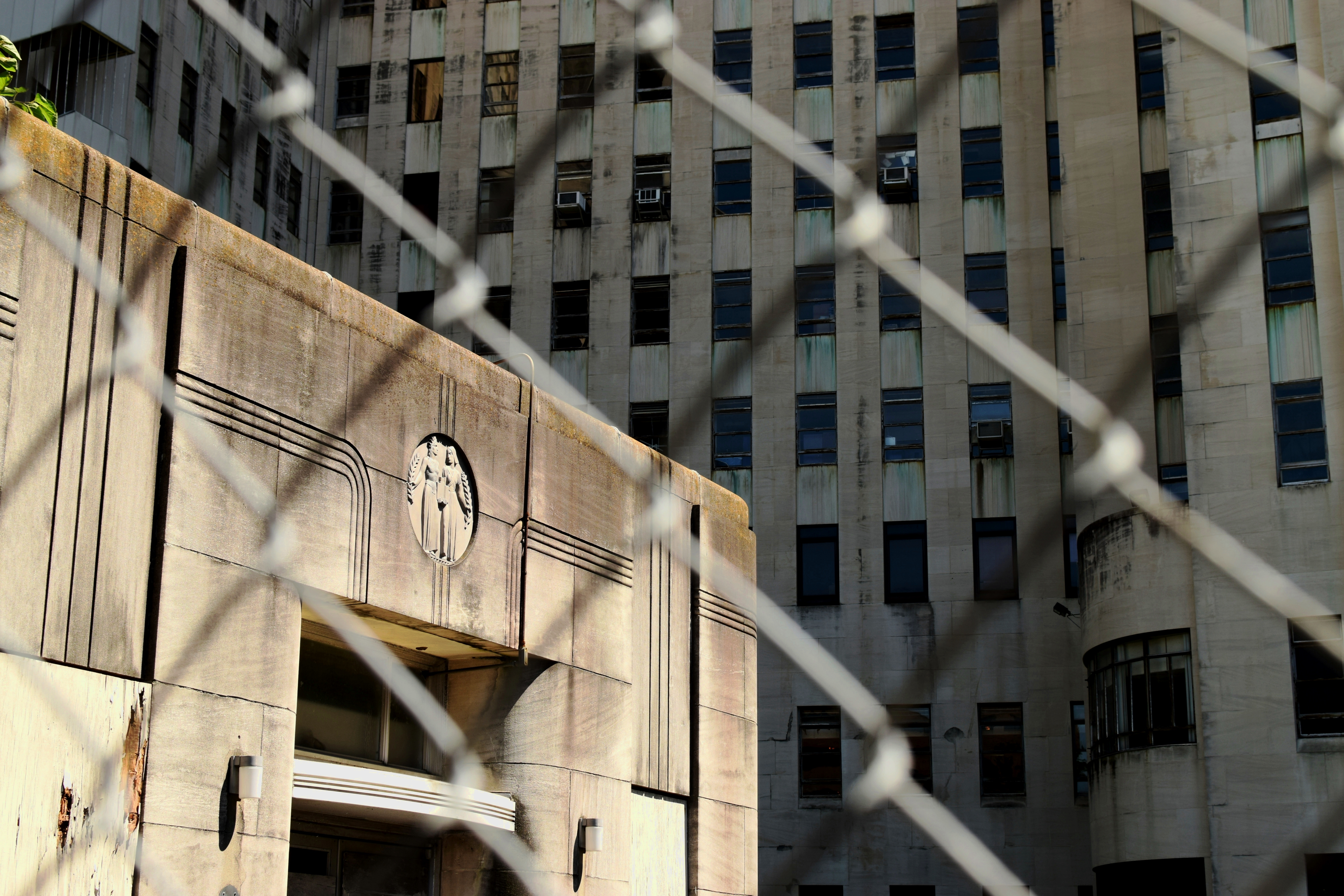
The main entrance to Charity Hospital from Tulane Ave.

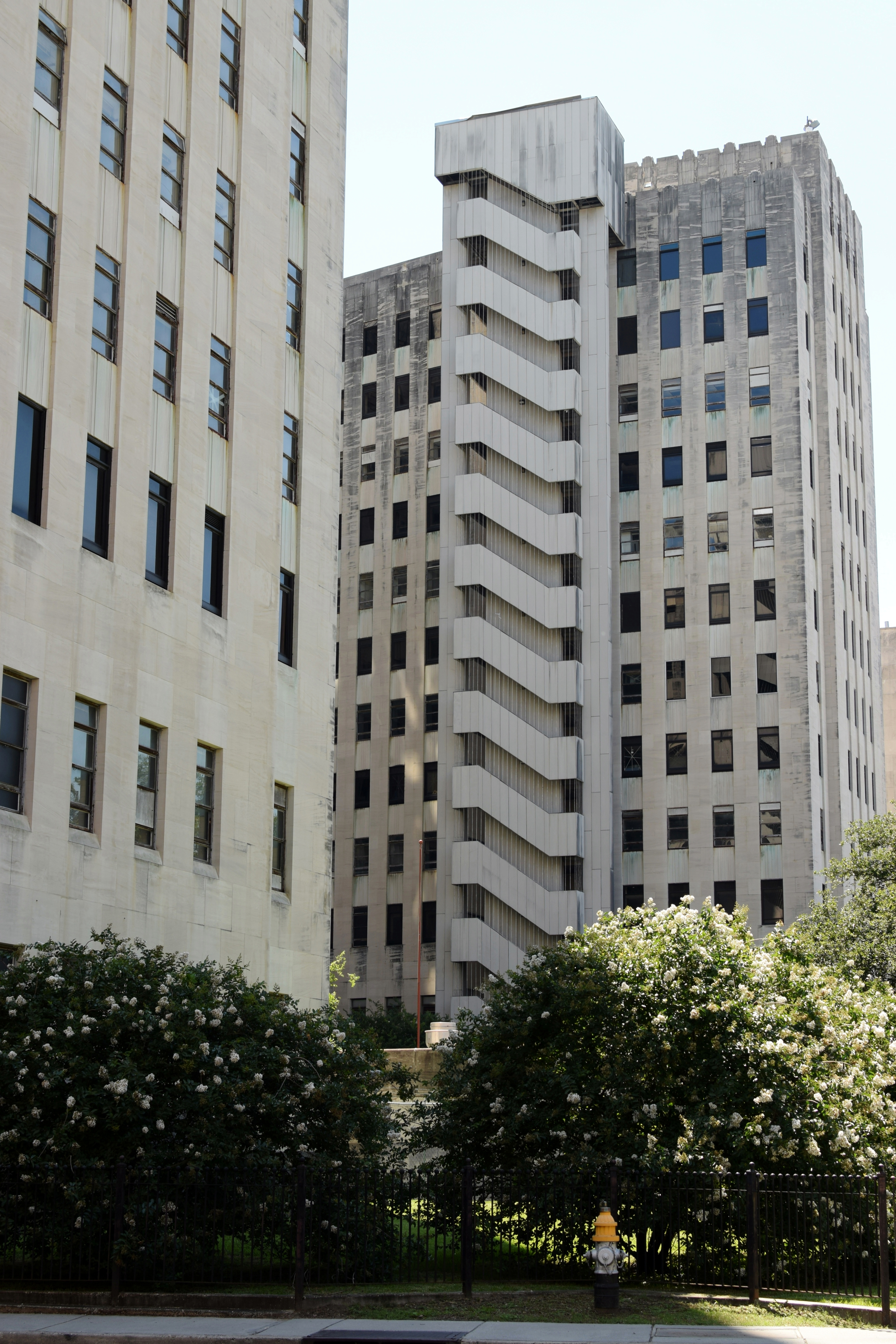
The fire escape stairway view from Tulane Ave.

=== Television ===
Charity Hospital was featured in the TLC documentary series Code Blue. The series documented the lives of the hospital physicians and their patients. The episodes often illustrated the rate of violence in New Orleans by chronicling the high volume of patients who were treated in the emergency department with gunshot or stab wounds.

Charity Hospital was also featured in two episodes of TLC's Trauma: Life in the ER, which focused on Charity's emergency department.

Charity Hospital was also in an episode of NY Med, where a doctor reminisces of his time spent at the hospital.

It was also briefly featured in MTV's The Real World: New Orleans, where Kelly stops by to visit her boyfriend Peter, who works there.

"Big Charity Hospital" is mentioned in season one of HBO's The Pitt as the site of Dr. Robinavitch's residency.

=== Film ===
- Big Charity: The Death of America's Oldest Hospital, a documentary film by Alexander John Glustrom, tells the story behind how the Louisiana State University (LSU) used Hurricane Katrina as an excuse to get one of the single largest payouts of federal disaster funds in state history. This whilst (1) closing down the original Charity Hospital, (2) building a 'replacement' on lands acquired by disowning people from their houses in a low income neighborhood, and (3) making the new hospital inaccessible for the indigent.
- The 2013 film Hours featured the hospital as the main focus of the story line as a father struggles to keep his infant daughter alive in the wake of Hurricane Katrina.
- Part two of director Spike Lee's four-part 2010 documentary If God Is Willing and da Creek Don't Rise features a lengthy segment on the battle over the future of Charity Hospital, featuring testimonials from doctors, politicians, historic preservation advocates, community activists, and other New Orleanians who fought to save the facility.
- In the 2023 film Renfield, the dilapidated basement of Charity Hospital is used as the modern-day location of Dracula's lair. Production designer Alec Hammond chose Charity Hospital based on its similarity to the design of Dracula's castle in classic movies. While also citing that the history of New Orleans was reflected in the design of the hospital, Hammond also noted that every historian he had met with while researching the hospital had stories to share about the location being haunted, which helped serve the myth of Dracula.

=== Books ===
==== Non-fiction ====
- Salvaggio, John E. New Orleans' Charity Hospital (1992).
- The last days of Charity Hospital were documented in Jim Carrier's book, Charity – The Heroic and Heartbreaking Story of Charity Hospital in Hurricane Katrina (2015).

==== Fiction ====
- In the 1980 novel A Confederacy of Dunces by John Kennedy Toole, one of Charity Hospital's ambulances is mentioned at the end of the story.
- In the 2015 novel Elemental Arcane by Phaedra Weldon, Charity Hospital is one of the locations mentioned.
- In Dolores Redondo's novel La Cara Norte del Corazón (2019), Charity Hospital appears in the last moments before evacuation during Hurricane Katrina.
- In the 2022 novel The Italian Prisoner by Elisa M. Speranza, the main character's sister is a WW2 Army nurse who studied and worked at Charity Hospital before the war.

== See also ==
- Common Ground Health Clinic – US non-profit organization in Louisiana
- Lindy Boggs Medical Center – Abandoned hospital in Louisiana, United States
- Louisiana State University System – Public university system in Louisiana
- LSU Health Sciences Center New Orleans – Public university in New Orleans, Louisiana, US
- Medical Center of Louisiana at New Orleans – Teaching hospital in the USA
- List of the oldest hospitals in the United States
- List of tallest buildings in New Orleans
- Tulane University School of Medicine – Medical school in New Orleans, Louisiana, US
- University Hospital, New Orleans
- University Medical Center New Orleans
