= East Jefferson General Hospital =

Coordinates: 30.0139°N 90.1812°W

Geography
- Location: 4200 Houma Blvd Metairie, LA 70006, U.S.

Organisation
- Type: Non-profit Hospital

Services
- Emergency department: Yes

History
- Founded: 1971; 55 years ago

Links
- Lists: Hospitals in U.S.

East Jefferson General Hospital is a hospital in Metairie, Louisiana (U.S.). The hospital broke ground in 1965 and is still expanding. The facility serves the people of the East Bank of Jefferson Parish.

== History ==
In 1965, the Jefferson Parish council passed an ordinance for the construction of a hospital service to be built on the East Bank of the Jefferson Parish. East Jefferson General Hospital inaugurated on February 14, 1971. It originally included 250 beds and 250 physicians. The hospital has since expanded adding medical office buildings, the Yenni Treatment Center for outpatient cancer treatment, and the Domino Pavilion (outpatient laboratory and outpatient radiology, as well as same-day treatments). The hospital's primary financial support comes through the EJGH Foundation. The hospital currently includes 420 beds and over 3000 employees (along with more than 650 physicians), making it one of the largest employers in the Parish region.

The hospital is publicly owned and not-for profit, governed by a 10-member volunteer Board of Directors appointed by the Jefferson Parish Council and the Parish President. The hospital is accredited by the Joint Commission on Accreditation of Healthcare Organizations. In 2002, East Jefferson General was the first hospital in Louisiana to receive the Magnet Recognition Program accreditation for nursing excellence. In 2008, EJGH became Louisiana's first hospital to earn affiliate status as a member of the MD Anderson Cancer Network. In 2016, EJGH completed a $2 million renovation of their Breast Care Center. The breast center currently performs over 11,000 mammograms, 3,800 ultrasounds and 500 image guided biopsies each year. In 2020 EJGH became part of LCMC Health in a move that preserved the high quality of care EJGH delivers to the region and was highlighted by a 95% positive vote from the citizens of Jefferson Parish. Key people include Richard Tanzella, CEO, Raymond DeCorte, M.D. (Chief Medical Officer), Jennifer Sillinsky, M.D. (Chief of Staff).

== Departments ==
- Cancer Care
- Cardiovascular Services
- Emergency Department
- Neurosciences
- Orthopedics
- Radiology
- Rehabilitative Services
- Stroke Care
- Surgery
- Newborn Services
- Diabetes Management
- Social Services
- Sleep Center
- Pulmonary Services
- Nutrition Services

== Hospital branches ==
- EJGH Extended Hours Kenner
- EJGH Lakeview
- EJGH Primary Care Destrehan
- East Jefferson Imaging Center (EJIC) at Clearview
- East Jefferson Imaging Center (EJIC) at Lakeview
- EJPG Urgent Care – Kenner
- EJ Primary Care – Destrehan
- EJ Primary Care – Kenner
- EJ Cardiology – Kenner
- EJ PT/Rehab – Kenner
- EJ Primary Care – Kenner II
- EJ Primary Care – Lakeview
- EJ OB/GYN – Lakeview
- EJ Spine Care – Lakeview
- EJ Primary Care – Old Metairie
- EJ Primary Care – River Ridge

== Awards ==
- Louisiana in Overall Hospital Care by CareChex
- Louisiana Designated Magnet Hospital by the American Nurses Credentialing Center
- Gold Plus Target Stroke Elite Plus
- One of the top institutions for stroke care by the American Heart Association
- Get With the Guidelines – Heart Failure Silver Plus Achievement Award – Ranked as a top responder to heart failures by the American Heart Association
- AHA EMS: Mission Lifeline Gold Award by U.S. News & World Report
- Award for top spine care by Blue Cross Blue Shield
- 2014 Top Performer on Key Quality Measures Recognizes EJGH as one of the top overall hospitals in the country by The Joint Commission
- Regionally Ranked Hospitals – #3 in Louisiana and #2 in Metro NOLA by U.S. News & World Report
- Rated High Performing in Adult Procedures by U.S. News & World Report for Heart Failure, Hip Replacement and Knee Replacement
- Named #1 Partner in the region in quality by the American College of Radiology
- Cardiac Rehabilitation
- American Association of Cardiovascular and Pulmonary Rehabilitation
- Diabetes Management Center
- Recognized by the American Diabetes Association
- Regional Cancer Center
- American College of Surgeons (ACS) Commission on Cancer
- Rehabilitative Services
- Commission of Accreditation for Rehabilitation Facilities (CARF)
- Pulmonary Rehabilitation
- American Association of Cardiovascular and Pulmonary Rehabilitation

== Accreditations ==
- The Joint Commission – Hospital and Nursing Care Center
- Society of Cardiovasculay Patient Care – Heart Failure Accreditation
- American Academy of Sleep Medicine – Sleep Disorders Program
- American College of Radiology (ACR) – Radiology Oncology Program
- Baby Friendly USA – Baby Friendly Hospital

== See also ==
- List of hospitals in Louisiana
- List of tallest buildings in Metairie
