= LSU Health Sciences Center New Orleans =

Public university in New Orleans, Louisiana, US

LSU Health New Orleans
- Type: Public university
- Established: 1931; 95 years ago
- Parent institution: LSU System
- Chancellor: Steve Nelson
- Faculty: 649
- Students: 2,699
- Location: New Orleans, Louisiana, United States]
- Campus: Urban
- Website: www.lsuhsc.edu
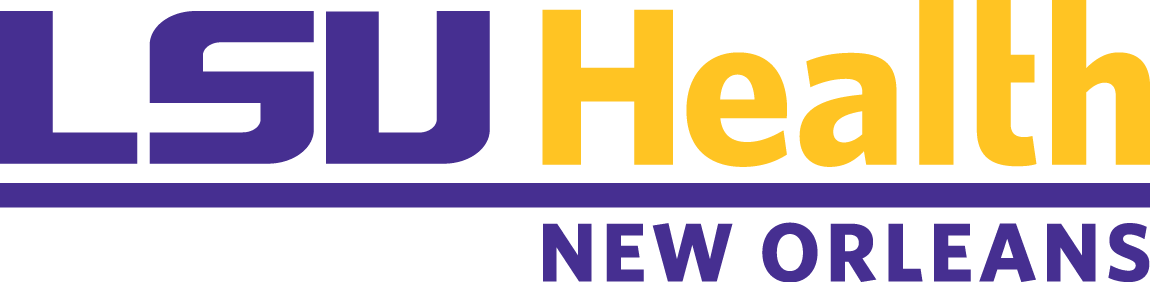

LSU Health New Orleans is a public university focused on the health sciences and located in New Orleans, Louisiana. It is part of the LSU System and is the home of six schools (including one of two LSU medical schools), 12 centers of excellence, and two patient care clinics.

Due to Hurricane Katrina, the School of Dentistry was temporarily located in Baton Rouge, but has since returned to its campus in New Orleans. As a public university, it mostly accepts residents of the state of Louisiana with the exception of combined M.D./Ph.D. students and children of alumni.

== History ==
The LSU Health Sciences Center School of Medicine was founded in 1931 commissioned by Governor Huey Pierce Long, Jr. It facility was originally located at 1542 Tulane Avenue, adjacent to the then-rebuilt Charity Hospital, which was completed in 1939.

Governor Long considered himself the "founder" of the LSU School of Medicine, having written in his autobiography, Every Man a King:

"There had been completed the magnificent structure for that school in the midst of the buildings of the Charity Hospital of New Orleans. That new school, upon examination, was found to have been supplied with every modern device or contrivance suggested and recommended by the national medical organizations. It was given 'A' rating by the American Medical Association before it had been in operation more than eighteen months."

The School of Graduate Studies was established in 1965, followed by the School of Dentistry in 1966, the School of Nursing in 1968, and the School of Allied Health Professions in 1970. The School of Public Health followed in 2003.

In the immediate wake of Hurricane Katrina, LSUHSC-NO suffered drastically lowered capacity at its two teaching hospitals, Charity Hospital and University Hospital. LSUHSC-NO went 15 months without the use of either facility, and was forced to set up a trauma center in a vacant shopping center. University Hospital was extensively renovated before reopening on November 20, 2006. The fate of Charity Hospital was a more controversial issue. Grassroots efforts to restore the Charity Hospital building failed when it was deemed by an arbitration panel to be more than 50% damaged.

In 2011, state and LSU officials broke ground on a $1.1 billion teaching hospital in the lower mid-city area of New Orleans. On August 1, 2015, University Medical Center New Orleans opened as a state-of-the-art academic medical center for medical, dental and allied health education in addition to bioscience research. The new facility is one of the anchors of New Orleans' biomedical research corridor.

== Organization ==
Undergraduate demographics as of Fall 2023
Race and ethnicity	Total
White	59%
Black	18%
Asian	9%
Hispanic	9%
Two or more races	3%
International student	1%
Unknown	1%
Economic diversity
Low-income (Note: The percentage of students who received an income-based federal Pell grant intended for low-income students.)	19%
Affluent (Note: The percentage of students who are a part of the American middle class at the bare minimum.)	81%

=== Schools ===
- School of Allied Health Professions
- School of Dentistry
- School of Graduate Studies
- School of Medicine
- School of Nursing
- School of Public Health

=== LSUHSC Teaching Hospital ===
- University Medical Center New Orleans

=== LSUHSC Clinics ===
- LSU Healthcare Network
- LSU Health Sciences Center School of Dentistry

== See also ==
- Louisiana State University System
- LSU Health Sciences Center Shreveport
