= Ochsner =

Ochsner is a German surname. Notable people with the surname include:

- Alton Ochsner (1896–1981), American surgeon and medical researcher who founded the Ochsner Foundation Hospital
- Berta Ochsner (1896–1942), American dancer, choreographer
- Jeffrey Karl Ochsner (born 1950), American architect, architectural historian, and academic
- Marion Mitchell Ochsner (1857–1932), American clubwoman
- Stephen Thomas Ochsner (born 1988), American actor
- Willifrank Ochsner (1899–1990), German general

== See also ==
- Ochsner Health System, a not-for-profit health care provider based in Louisiana
- Ochsner Baptist Medical Center, a hospital in New Orleans, Louisiana
- Ochsner Medical Center, a hospital in Jefferson, Louisiana
- Ochsner Medical Center - Kenner, a hospital in Kenner, Louisiana
- Ochsner Medical Center - West Bank, a hospital in Gretna, Louisiana
- Patent Ochsner, one of Switzerland's best-known rock bands
