= List of hospitals in Louisiana =

This is a list of hospitals in the state of Louisiana. See also List of medical schools in the United States.

== Bossier and Caddo parishes ==
- Brentwood Hospital - Shreveport
- Christus Bossier Emergency Hospital - Bossier City
- Christus Highland Medical Center - Shreveport
- Ochsner LSU Health Shreveport - Academic Medical Center - Shreveport
- Ochsner LSU Health Shreveport - St. Mary Medical Center (formerly Christus Schumpert Medical Center) - Shreveport
- Ochsner LSU Health Shreveport - Louisiana Behavioral Health - Shreveport
- Overton Brooks VA Medical Center - Shreveport
- Shriners Hospital - Shreveport
- Willis-Knighton Bossier Health Center - Bossier City
- Willis-Knighton Medical Center - Shreveport
- Willis-Knighton Pierremont Health Center - Shreveport
- Willis-Knighton South & the Center for Women’s Health - Shreveport
- Willis-Knighton James K. Elrod Rehabilitation - Shreveport

== Calcasieu Parish ==
- Christus St. Patrick Hospital - Lake Charles
- Lake Charles Memorial Hospital - Lake Charles
- Lake Charles Memorial Hospital for Women - Lake Charles
- West Calcasieu Cameron Hospital - Sulphur
- Women and Children's Hospital - Lake Charles

== East Baton Rouge Parish ==
- Baton Rouge General Medical Center – Bluebonnet Campus - Baton Rouge
- Baton Rouge General Medical Center – Mid-City Campus - Baton Rouge
- Earl K. Long Medical Center (defunct) - Baton Rouge
- Lane Regional Medical Center - Zachary
- Mary Bird Perkins Cancer Center - Baton Rouge
- The NeuroMedical Center - Baton Rouge
- Ochsner Medical Center - Baton Rouge - Baton Rouge
- Our Lady of the Lake Regional Medical Center - Baton Rouge
- Surgical Specialty Center - Baton Rouge
- Vista Surgical Hospital - Baton Rouge
- Woman's Hospital - Baton Rouge

== Jefferson Parish ==
- East Jefferson General Hospital - Metairie
- Ochsner Medical Center - Jefferson, Louisiana
- Ochsner Medical Center - Kenner (formerly Kenner Regional Medical Center) - Kenner
- Ochsner Medical Center - West Bank (formerly Meadowcrest Hospital) - Gretna
- Tulane–Lakeside Hospital - Metairie
- West Jefferson Medical Center - Marrero

== Lafayette Parish ==
- HealthSouth Rehabilitation Hospital of Lafayette - Lafayette
- Lafayette General Medical Center - Lafayette
- Lafayette General Southwest - Lafayette
- Our Lady of Lourdes Regional Medical Center - Lafayette
- University Medical Center - Lafayette
- Women's and Children's Hospital - Lafayette

== Lafourche, St. Charles and Terrebonne parishes ==
- Leonard J. Chabert Medical Center - Houma
- Ochsner St Anne General Hospital - Raceland
- Our Lady of the Sea Hospital - Cut Off
- St. Charles Parish Hospital - Luling
- Terrebonne General Medical Center - Houma
- Thibodaux Regional Medical Center - Thibodaux

== LaSalle Parish ==
- Hospital Service District #2 of LaSalle Parish or LaSalle General Hospital - Jena

== Orleans Parish ==
- Charity Hospital (defunct) - New Orleans
- Children's Hospital of New Orleans - New Orleans
- Flint-Goodridge Hospital (defunct) - New Orleans
- French Hospital (defunct) - New Orleans
- Lindy Boggs Medical Center (defunct) - New Orleans
- New Orleans East Hospital (Eastern New Orleans) - New Orleans
- Ochsner Baptist Medical Center (formerly Memorial Medical Center) - New Orleans
- Touro Infirmary - New Orleans
- Tulane University Medical Center - New Orleans
- University Hospital, New Orleans (defunct) - New Orleans
- University Medical Center New Orleans - New Orleans
- VA Medical Center of New Orleans - New Orleans

== Ouachita and Morehouse parishes ==
- Bastrop Rehabilitation Hospital - Bastrop
- Glenwood Regional Medical Center - West Monroe
- Monroe Surgical Hospital - Monroe
- Morehouse General Hospital - Bastrop
- Ochsner LSU Health Shreveport - Monroe Medical Center (formerly EA Conway Hospital) - Monroe
- P & S Surgery Center - Monroe
- Saint Francis Medical Center - Monroe
- Saint Francis Specialty Hospital - Monroe

== Rapides Parish ==
- Central Louisiana Surgical Hospital - Alexandria
- Christus St. Francis Cabrini Hospital - Alexandria
- Huey P. Long Medical Center - Pineville
- Rapides Regional Medical Center - Alexandria

== St. Tammany, Tangipahoa, and Washington parishes ==
- Cypress Pointe Surgical Hospital - Hammond
- Hood Memorial Hospital - Amite
- Lakeview Regional Medical Center - Covington
- Lallie Kemp Regional Medical Center - Independence
- Louisiana Heart Hospital - Lacombe
- North Oaks Medical Center - Hammond
- North Oaks Rehabilitation Hospital - Hammond
- Northshore Psychiatric Hospital - Slidell
- Ochsner Medical Center – Northshore - Slidell
- Our Lady of Angels Hospital - Bogalusa
- Riverside Medical Center - Franklinton
- St. Tammany Parish Hospital - Covington
- Slidell Memorial Hospital and Medical Center - Slidell
- Sterling Surgical Hospital - Slidell

== Other Louisiana parishes ==
- Abbeville General Hospital - Abbeville
- Acadia-St. Landry Hospital - Church Point
- Acadian Medical Center - Eunice
- Allen Parish Hospital - Kinder
- Assumption General Medical Center - Napoleonville
- Avoyelles Hospital - Marksville
- Bayne Jones Army Community Hospital - Fort Johnson
- Beauregard Memorial Hospital - De Ridder
- Byrd Regional Hospital - Leesville
- Elizabeth Hospital - Elizabeth
- Hardtner Medical Center - Olla
- Iberia Medical Center - New Iberia
- Iberia Medical Center - North Campus - New Iberia
- National Leprosarium (defunct) - Carville
- Oakdale Community Hospital - Oakdale
- Ochsner Medical Complex – Iberville - Plaquemine
- Opelousas General Hospital - Opelousas
- Our Lady of the Lake Ascension (formerly St. Elizabeth Hospital) - Gonzales
- Plaquemines Parish Medical Center - Port Sulphur
- Pointe Coupee General Hospital - New Roads
- Prairieville Family Hospital - Prairieville
- St. Bernard Parish Hospital - Chalmette
- St. James Parish Hospital - Lutcher
- Savoy Medical Center - Mamou
- South Cameron Memorial Hospital - Creole
- Teche Regional Medical Center - Morgan City
- Winn Parish Medical Center - Winnfield

== See also ==
- Jefferson Parish Hospital District No. 2 v. Hyde: Supreme Court case involving hospital
- Levy v. Louisiana: Supreme Court case involving hospital in New Orleans
- Medical Center of Louisiana at New Orleans
- Ochsner Health System
