= Our Lady of the Lake College =

Our Lady of the Lake College may refer to

- Former name of Franciscan Missionaries of Our Lady University in Baton Rouge, Louisiana
- Former name of Our Lady of the Lake University in San Antonio, Texas

== See also ==
- Our Lady of the Lake Catholic Academy
- Our Lady of the Lake Ascension
- Our Lady of the Lake Catholic High School
- Our Lady of the Lake Regional Medical Center
- Our Lady of the Lakes Catholic School (Michigan)
