= Knock and talk =

Investigative technique in law enforcement

In law enforcement, a knock and talk is an investigative technique where one or more police officers approaches a private residence, knocks on the door, and requests consent from the owner to search the residence. This strategy is often utilised when criminal activity is suspected, but there is not sufficient evidence to obtain a search warrant.

== In the United States ==
The legality of the knock and talk procedure has been carefully scrutinized and reviewed by American courts at the state and federal level. Rulings in both the Ninth Circuit case United States v. Cormier and Seventh Circuit case United States v. Jerez have held that evidence obtained from a consensual search following a knock and talk is admissible, but only if the knock and talk is not conducted in a coercive or aggressive manner. Per Bumper v. North Carolina, the use of deception to obtain consent can also in some cases prevent the search from being upheld.

Per Kentucky v. King, when a police officer who is not armed with a search warrant knocks on a door and requests the opportunity to speak, the occupant has no obligation to open the door or to speak.
