= Ochsner Baptist Medical Center =

- Ochsner Health System
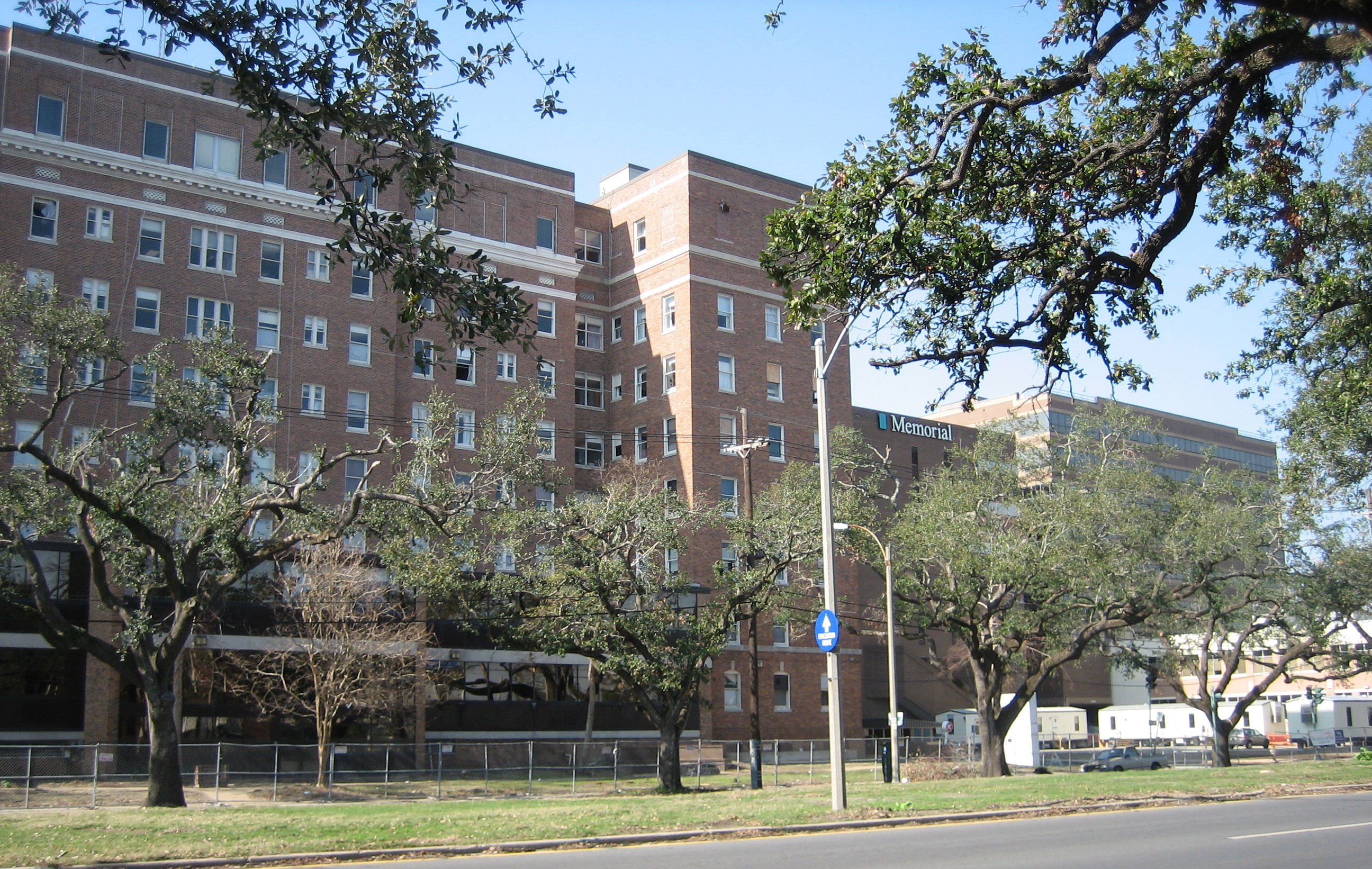
- The Medical Center seen from Napoleon Avenue in early January 2006. The hospital complex was fenced off with temporary trailers for workers.

Geography
- Location: New Orleans, Louisiana, United States
- Coordinates: 29.93792601064523°N 90.10439620560187°W

Services
- Emergency department: Yes

History
- Former name: Southern Baptist Hospital Mercy-Baptist Medical Center Memorial Medical Center
- Opened: 1926

Links
- Lists: Hospitals in Louisiana

Ochsner Baptist Medical Center is a hospital in New Orleans, Louisiana. The complex of hospital buildings is located on Napoleon Avenue in Uptown New Orleans.

== History ==
Formerly known as Southern Baptist Hospital, it was founded in 1926 by the Southern Baptist Convention and led by Louis Judson Bristow beginning in 1924 during the building of the hospital through 1947 when he retired as Superintendent of the hospital. In 1969, the religious organization separated itself from the hospital (and several others) and Southern Baptist Hospital became an independent non-profit entity. In the early 1980s the hospital spent over $100,000,000 (Project 2000) to add to and renovate the original building. In 1990 it merged with Mercy Hospital (now called Lindy Boggs Medical Center, located near the end of Bayou St. John on Norman Francis Parkway) and the two hospitals operated as Mercy-Baptist Medical Center, with the old Southern Baptist Hospital called the Uptown Campus and Mercy called the Mid-City campus. The combined hospitals were acquired by Tenet Healthcare, and the old Baptist Hospital was renamed Memorial Medical Center in 1996. (It was known colloquially as "Memorial Baptist.") After Hurricane Katrina in 2005, Tenet sold several of its hospitals in New Orleans to Ochsner Health System, and in 2006 the name was changed to Ochsner Baptist Medical Center, bringing a portion of the original name back into use.

The hospital had been the official healthcare provider of the New Orleans Saints football team since 1967, when the Saints made Ken Saer the team's original orthopedic surgeon.

=== Hurricane Katrina ===
The hospital and the area around it flooded in the aftermath of Hurricane Katrina in 2005, rendering the hospital an island with the bottom floor flooded, with no electricity or other utilities after the emergency generators failed. The hospital was closed after the surviving patients and staff were able to be evacuated after several days. The hospital remained closed through 2005 and into 2006 until it was sold in August 2006.

==== Involuntary euthanasia controversy and murder prosecutions ====
National attention was drawn to the hospital when CNN reported on October 12, 2005, that the Louisiana attorney general was investigating the possibility that mercy killings of critically ill patients by staff medical professionals at Memorial Medical Center in New Orleans occurred while staff and patients were stranded in the hospital after Hurricane Katrina. On September 13, 2005 Tenet Healthcare Corporation stated: "No patients drowned nor did any die as a result of lack of food or drinking water." Anna Pou and two nurses were arrested in July 2006. In July 2007, a Louisiana grand jury declined to indict Pou. Since then, the charges have been expunged, and the state of Louisiana has agreed to pay Pou's legal fees. In August 2009, a review was re-initiated after a New York Times article quoted Dr. Ewing Cook saying that Memorial patients were given morphine and other drugs after the hurricane struck to accelerate their deaths. In March 2010, New Orleans coroner Frank Minyard concluded that the death of one of the patients, Jannie Burgess, was not a homicide, and thus essentially cleared the doctors of wrongdoing.

=== Post-Katrina ===
On 29 June 2006, Tenet announced that Memorial and three other hospitals in Greater New Orleans were among eleven they planned to sell by mid-2007.

On 19 July 2006, Ochsner Health System announced they were acquiring Memorial Medical Center along with two other Tenet Hospitals in the Greater New Orleans area, Meadowcrest Hospital in Gretna, Louisiana and Kenner Regional Medical Center in Kenner, Louisiana. The sale was expected to be finalized by the end of August.

In late January 2009, Ochsner Baptist opened a new 12-bed Emergency Department, featuring two trauma rooms, nine examination rooms, and one triage room. This renovation also included the addition of 43 private rooms and an expansion of the hospital's Intensive Care Unit from three to 12 beds.

Although most of the hospital has been renovated, one building, including the original main entrance to Memorial, is still abandoned. The abandoned areas are almost untouched as of January 2023.

The current 6th floor of Ochsner Baptist (serving as the Mother-Baby Unit) is located directly underneath the 7th floor previously inhabited by LifeCare Hospital during Hurricane Katrina. LifeCare was one of the main sites where the events in 5 Days at Memorial took place. As of 2025, the 7th floor has remained untouched, with all the evidence from Hurricane Katrina still preserved. There is no access to the floor except to select hospital staff. All public elevators stop at the 6th floor and stairwells are blocked and locked. The hospital has said they have plans to renovate the space, but as of September 2025 no such construction has been scheduled.

Ochsner Baptist opened the new $40 million Women's Pavilion on December 1, 2013. It includes the women's services departments of OB/GYN clinic, Labor and Delivery, and Maternal Fetal Medicine, as well as the Level III Neonatal Intensive Care Unit previously located Ochsner Medical Center on Jefferson Highway. In the early morning hours of December 1, eight mothers, 31 NICU babies, and three newborns were transported via ambulance from Ochsner Main on Jefferson Highway.

== Notable births ==
- Veleka Gray, actress
- Reese Witherspoon, actress
- Peyton Manning, American football quarterback
- Eli Manning, American football quarterback
