= Aline Betancourt =

American biochemist

Academic background
- Education: Tulane University (BS); Georgetown University (PhD)

Aline M. Betancourt is an American biochemist, an associate professor of medicine and microbiology at Tulane University. Betancourt works on developing mesenchymal stem cell (MSC) based therapies, and is the CSO and founder of two companies aimed at producing clinical products using this technology.

== Education ==
She received a B.S. in Biochemistry from Tulane University, a Ph.D. in Microbiology from Georgetown University, and completed a postdoctoral fellowship at the National Institutes of Health-National Cancer Institute. She joined the Tulane faculty in 1997. She has worked on mesenchymal stem cells over the last two decades.

== Research ==
Betancourt's research focuses on the environments of tumors, including their oxygen-sensing mechanisms, genes that regulate oxygen pathways, RNA binding proteins, and angiogenesis. Tumor angiogenesis (formation of new blood vessels) depends on a balance between tumor-dependent angiogenic factors like VEGF (vascular endothelial growth factor). By leveraging this dependence of growing tumor cells, she has worked to trigger hypoxia and control this normal physiologic process. Her most cited publications are:

- Waterman RS, Tomchuck SL, Henkle SL, Betancourt AM. A new mesenchymal stem cell (MSC) paradigm: polarization into a pro-inflammatory MSC1 or an Immunosuppressive MSC2 phenotype. PLOS ONE. 2010 Apr 26;5(4):e10088. According to Google Scholar it has been cited 930 times.
- Bonvillain RW, Danchuk S, Sullivan DE, Betancourt AM, Semon JA, Eagle ME, Mayeux JP, Gregory AN, Wang G, Townley IK, Borg ZD. A nonhuman primate model of lung regeneration: detergent-mediated decellularization and initial in vitro recellularization with mesenchymal stem cells. Tissue Engineering Part A. 2012 Dec 1;18(23–24):2437-52.According to Google Scholar, it has been cited 157 times.
- Waterman RS, Henkle SL, Betancourt AM. Mesenchymal stem cell 1 (MSC1)-based therapy attenuates tumor growth whereas MSC2-treatment promotes tumor growth and metastasis. PLOS ONE. 2012 Sep 20;7(9):e45590. According to Google Scholar, it has been cited 157 times.

== Commercialization ==
Betacourt was the founder of Commence Bio; it was begun in 2010, as WibiWorks Therapeutics, Inc. with the name changed to Commence Bio in 2016. The company hopes to develop treatments for cancer and inflammatory diseases by using |mesenchymal stem cells. Their work focused on rebooting patients' immune systems with MSC1 & MSC2. She worked with a research team including Ruth S. Waterman to develop the proprietary Stimulated Toll-like Receptor Technology (STaRT). which programs MSCs to act in either an anti-tumor (MSC1) or anti-inflammatory (MSC2) capacity. This takes advantage of Toll-Like Receptors (TLR), naturally occurring molecules that the body's innate immune system uses to sense and respond to invading microbes. STaRT stimulates TLR3 to generate MSC2 cells and TLR4 to generate MSC1 cells. This platform is intended to be used for the treatment of cancer and inflammatory diseases. The product is still in the pre-clinical stages.

Betacourt is also the founder of VITAbolus, founded in 2018 in San Diego. based The firm plans to make stem cell treatment readily available via stem cell pills, where the anti-inflammatory stem cells are delivered directly to the intestines and colon within protected capsules. Their current project is intended to be the first oral stem cell pill for Crohn’s disease. They are currently only in the pre-clinical stage.
