= COVID LA =

COVID LA may refer to:

- COVID-19 pandemic in Los Angeles
- COVID-19 pandemic in Louisiana
