= Biomedical Research Institute =

Biomedical Research Institute may refer to:

- Biomedisch Onderzoeksinstituut or BIOMED in Belgium
- Los Angeles Biomedical Research Institute or LA BioMed
- Part of Louisiana State University Health Sciences Center Shreveport
