= Ruth S. Waterman =

American anesthesiologist

Ruth S. Waterman is an American anesthesiologist, Chair of the Department of Anesthesiology at UC San Diego Health, Associate Clinical Professor at UC San Diego School of Medicine, and Co-Founder and Chief Medical Officer of Commence Bio, a company that specializes in next generation stem cell therapy and cancer immunotherapy. Waterman is known for developing stem cell-based therapies to help patients with pain and advancing methods to personalize pain medicine based on pre-surgery genetic testing.

== Education ==
Waterman earned a master's degree in biology from the University of New Orleans and her medical degree from Louisiana State University School of Medicine. She completed her residency at Tulane University School of Medicine and a fellowship in anesthesiology at Ochsner Medical Center in New Orleans. She is board-certified in anesthesiology.

== Career ==
=== UC San Diego ===
Waterman joined UC San Diego's faculty in 2013. As Interim Department Chair, she leads clinical care and operations for the Department of Anesthesiology at Jacobs Medical Center at UC San Diego Health in La Jolla and UC San Diego Medical Center in Hillcrest, San Diego.

Waterman's academic research has been published in peer-reviewed journals and books, including PLOS ONE and Stem Cell Translational Medicine. She holds a patent for “Germ-Resistant Communication and Data Transfer/Entry Products," a technology that is now used in products manufactured by Fellowes, Inc. and ThyssenKrupp.

=== Commence Bio ===
Waterman co-founded Commence Bio to treat cancer and inflammatory diseases by stimulating patients' immune systems with mesenchymal stem cells (MSC). To do this, her team developed the proprietary Stimulated Toll-like Receptor Technology (STaRT). STaRT programs MSCs to act in either an anti-tumor (MSC1) or anti-inflammatory (MSC2) capacity. The STaRT approach takes advantage of Toll-Like Receptors (TLR), a family of naturally occurring molecules that the body's innate immune system uses to sense and respond to invading microbes. STaRT stimulates TLR3 to generate MSC2 cells and TLR4 to generate MSC1 cells. The company has not yet produced any clinical stage products.
