= Lafayette Charity Hospital =

- Charity Hospitals Louisiana
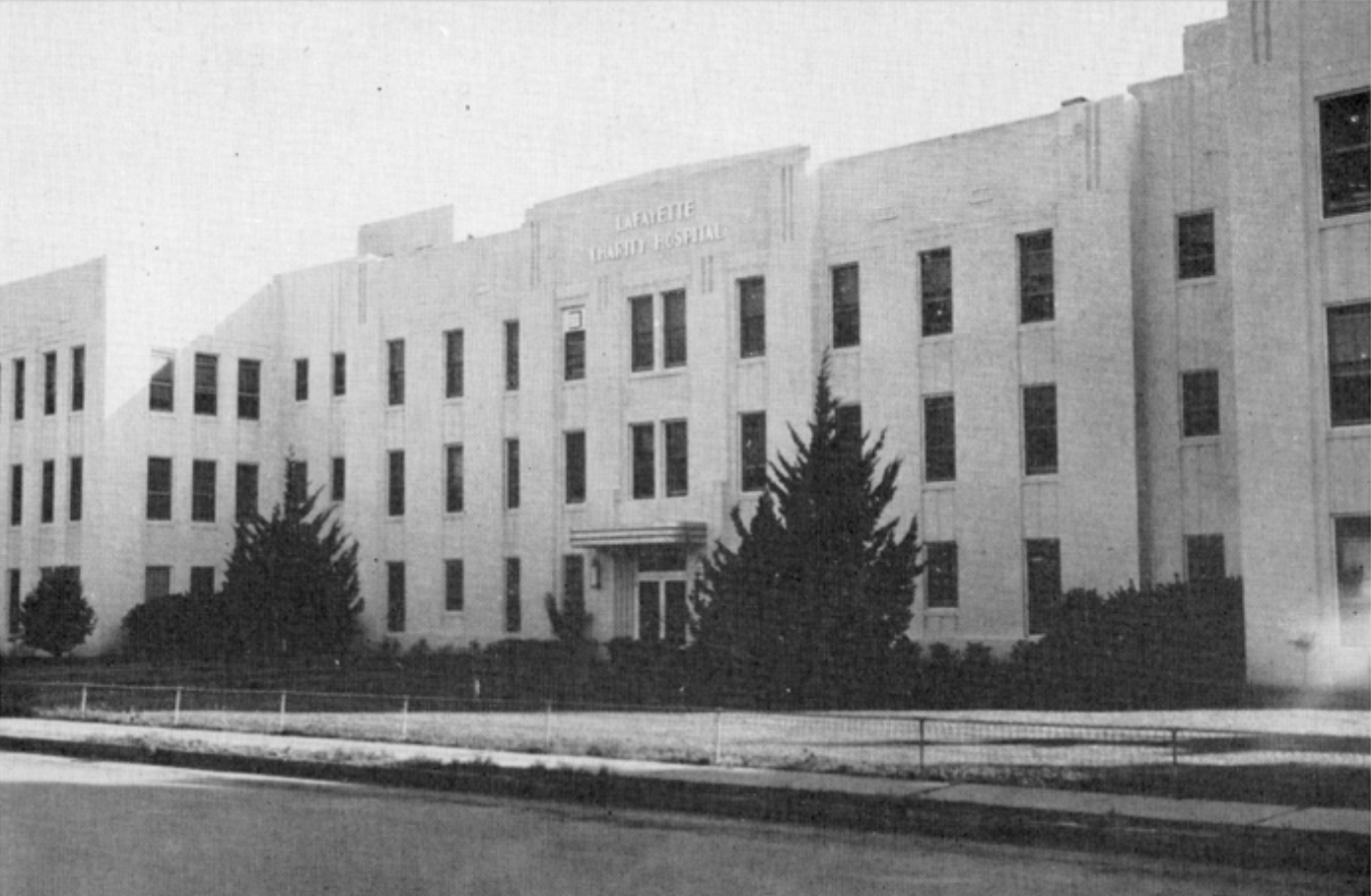

Geography
- Location: 311 West Saint Mary Boulevard, Lafayette, Louisiana, United States
- Coordinates: 30.21565°N 92.02363°W

Organization
- Type: General, Teaching
- Affiliated university: Louisiana State University School of Medicine; University of Louisiana at Lafayette

Services
- Beds: 346

History
- Constructed: February 02, 1938
- Opened: September 29, 1938
- Closed: June 12, 1982
- Demolished: January 1984

Links
- Lists: Hospitals in Louisiana

Lafayette Charity Hospital at 311 West St. Mary Boulevard in Lafayette, Louisiana, was a state-owned teaching hospital that opened on September 29, 1938, to provide free medical care for the indigent population of southwest Louisiana and the Heart of Acadiana. On June 12, 1982, Lafayette Charity Hospital (by then an outmoded facility) closed.

It was replaced by the University Medical Center (Lafayette) at a nearby site to continue as part of the State of Louisiana's System of Charity Hospitals. The old hospital building on St. Mary Blvd. was demolished in January 1984.

== History ==
In 1936, during the Great Depression, Louisiana Governor Richard Leche launched a Program to build multiple public hospitals strategically located throughout the State that were easily accessible to provide free medical care for significant numbers of indigent people where they lived. The only public hospitals then serving indigent people in Louisiana, of which there were many, were at the opposite ends of the State, one in New Orleans (New Orleans Charity Hospital) in the southeast and the other in Shreveport (Shreveport Charity Hospital) in the northwest. Lafayette Charity Hospital, serving southwest Louisiana and the Heart of Acadiana, became the first of these eight new Charity Hospitals.

== Construction, opening, and first superintendent ==
Dr. O.P. Daly was instrumental in bringing Charity Hospital to Lafayette. He headed the State Planning Group for carrying out Governor Huey Long's vision for a system of state-owned Charity Hospitals in Louisiana. On August 24, 1937, Daly sold his St. John Hospital on St. Mary Boulevard to the State of Louisiana for $50,000, and the State renamed it Lafayette Charity Hospital. Dr. Daly was appointed the first Superintendent of Lafayette Charity Hospital.

On February 2, 1938, extensive renovation and additional construction started on the two-story building that accommodated only 40 patients. At the Hospital groundbreaking ceremonies, Louisiana Governor Richard Leche stated, "We are here to discharge a long overdue obligation of government to take care of those who, for reasons beyond their control, cannot take care of themselves." Lieutenant Governor Earl K. Long stated, “Louisiana is one of the six states that attempt to furnish free hospitals to its people."

One-storey and two three-storey wings were added to the original two-storey hospital building. On completion, the Hospital cost $500,000 and was described as "modern in every respect.". It had a floor space of 30,250 square feet with 242 beds and 23 wards and became the largest Hospital in Lafayette.

The completed Lafayette Charity Hospital received its first patient on September 1, 1938, and formally opened on September 29, 1938. Admission was free and restricted to the indigent, except for emergencies. It quickly became crowded to capacity. After only months of operation, “officials estimated that nearly 5,000 needy people would have gone untreated were it not for the state hospitalization plan.”

In 1950, a 104-bed, $1,200,000 Tuberculosis Unit was established as an Annex of Lafayette Charity Hospital and served as a referral center for eleven Louisiana parishes.

== Span of service ==
In 1949–50, Lafayette Charity Hospital ranked third among State hospitals for number of births. During this time, there were also 10,900 hospital admissions, 18,852 outpatients, and 853 accident victims treated.

In 1962, 9,591 patients were admitted to Lafayette Charity Hospital; 306 patients were treated daily in the clinics, admitting rooms, and accident rooms, and 4,378 babies were delivered.

In 1967–68, there were 6,473 patients treated in Lafayette Charity Hospital, 62,566 patients treated in the clinics, 3,700 surgeries, and 3,359 births. The Admitting and Accident Departments had full-time staff and were open 24 hours a day.

As of 1975, Lafayette Charity Hospital's Emergency Room treated approximately 50,000 patients annually. Dr. Michael Prejean, co-director of the Emergency Room, stated, "To the indigent population, our emergency room serves the same function as the general practitioner's office would serve out in the community."

During its 44 years (1938-1982), despite many obstacles, Lafayette Charity Hospital provided progressive modern medical care and a safety net for many indigent people in southwest Louisiana and the Heart of Acadiana. It also served as a clinical training Hospital for physicians, nurses, medical technologists, medical record librarians, blood bank technologists, and radiologic technologists, many of whom remained in the Acadiana area to practice.

== Notable services ==
On January 30, 1963, The Daily Advertiser reported: "Since it was built in 1937, Lafayette Charity Hospital has been regarded as a haven for underprivileged persons in southwest Louisiana needing medical attention. It has also become known in medical circles as one of the finest training institutions for doctors and nurses in Louisiana."

On March 30, 1971, The Daily Advertiser reported: "Lafayette Charity Hospital is a teaching center and provides the area with many skilled doctors, nurses, and other hospital personnel."

On February 23, 1975, The Daily Advertiser reported: "Lafayette Charity Hospital, which a few years ago was short of staff, short of facilities, short of money and lacking in almost everything else except a small, dedicated staff, has blossomed into an institution offering patient care and education that ranks with the best in the state."

On January 31, 1975, The Daily Advertiser reported: “A recent survey by the Acadiana Planning Council using Joint Commission on Accreditation of Hospitals' guidelines for emergency services found that Lafayette Charity Hospital was the only facility in the eight parish Acadiana area that provides 24-hour emergency coverage with physicians at the hospital at all times with all specialty services available.”

On February 8, 1963, the Charity Hospital TB Annex which served 11 parishes attracted national attention. The National Association of Tuberculosis sent a team of researchers to Lafayette Charity Hospital to observe its group teaching, patient rehabilitation, and continuing education methods since the rate of return of TB patients to Lafayette Charity Hospital for TB care was far better than the national average.

== Notable staff ==
Dr. O. P. Daly was instrumental in bringing Charity Hospital to Lafayette and was Lafayette Charity Hospital's first (1938-1941) and fifth (1952-1968) Superintendent. He was credited as being instrumental in forming and conducting the hospital's clinical training programs for physicians, nurses, medical technologists, medical record librarians, blood bank technologists, and radiologic technologists during his tenure.

On March 12, 1959, at a ceremony in New Orleans, former Governor Sam H. Jones presented Miss Hermine Tate, Director, and initiator of the Lafayette Charity Hospital Blood Bank, the first annual Charles E. Dunbar, Jr. Career Service Award for "Distinguished Public Service ." According to the Louisiana Civil Service League, The Dunbar Award "is the highest honor classified state employees can receive for their service to the citizens of Louisiana".

In 1962, Miss Tate received the first Louisiana Medical Technologist of the Year Award.

The University Medical Center Lafayette named its Blood Bank, the Hermine Tate Blood Bank, in her memory.
