= Mary Bird Perkins Cancer Center =

Nonprofit cancer care organization based in Louisiana, U.S.

Geography
- Location: Baton Rouge, Louisiana, Southeast Louisiana, Southwest Mississippi, United States

Organization
- Care system: Community-based

History
- Founded: 1971

Links
- Website: marybird.org
- Lists: Hospitals in the United States

Mary Bird Perkins Cancer Center (MBPCC) is a nonprofit, community-owned cancer care organization headquartered in Baton Rouge, Louisiana, with a network of centers across Louisiana and Mississippi. It focuses exclusively on cancer treatment, research, education, prevention, and early detection, with the mission to "improve survivorship and lessen the burden of cancer."

== History ==
In the late 1960s, sixteen community leaders headed by Dr. M. J. Rathbone Jr. and Anna B. Lipsey saw the need for a community-owned, nonprofit radiation cancer facility in the greater Baton Rouge area. With the vision and support of the Baton Rouge community, the Cancer Radiation & Research Foundation—now known as Mary Bird Perkins Cancer Center—was established.

In 1968, the Foundation held a capital campaign capped by a generous gift of land from philanthropist Paul D. Perkins in honor of his late daughter, Mary Bird.

In 1971, the Mary Bird Perkins Radiation Treatment Center opened its doors in Baton Rouge.

After 14 years of operation, in 1985 the Center relocated to its present site on Essen Lane and installed the first linear accelerator in the state of Louisiana.

The following year, in 1986, the name of the center was changed to Mary Bird Perkins Cancer Center.

In 1988, the first satellite treatment center was opened in Hammond, followed by additional centers across southeast Louisiana and southwest Mississippi: Covington (1998), Houma (2008), Gonzales (2009), and Natchez, Mississippi (2019).

In 2018, Mary Bird Perkins Cancer Center, Our Lady of the Lake, and Woman's Hospital opened the Breast & GYN Cancer Pavilion, now known as the Woman's Cancer Pavilion.

From its inception, Mary Bird Perkins has remained a community initiative supported by regional partners and donors, providing state-of-the-art technology and comprehensive cancer care with a focus on prevention, detection, treatment, and survivorship.

== Services ==
Mary Bird Perkins Cancer Center offers a full continuum of cancer care—from prevention and early detection to diagnosis, treatment, survivorship, and research.

Services include:

- Diagnostic Imaging
- Disease Site Teams
- Endocrinology
- Genetic Counseling
- Head and Neck Center
- Medical Oncology
- Nutritional Services
- Palliative Care
- Patient Navigation & Social Services
- Radiation Oncology
- Rheumatology
- Support & Survivorship
- Surgery
- Technology (advanced radiation therapy and imaging technologies)
- Tumor Conferences
- Tumor Registry

== Locations and Network ==
Mary Bird Perkins Cancer Center serves communities throughout Louisiana and southwest Mississippi through a growing network of regional campuses, partner hospitals, and specialty clinics.

- Baton Rouge, LA – Main Campus, 4950 Essen Lane (link)
- Baton Rouge General – Partnership site (link)
- Baton Rouge Breast Surgery – Breast surgical oncology services (link)
- Woman's Hospital – Woman's Cancer Pavilion, partnership site (link)
- Hammond, LA – 15728 Jay Smith Dr. (link)
- Covington, LA – 1203 S. Tyler Street (link)
- Covington Breast Imaging – Diagnostic and screening imaging (link)
- Covington Breast Surgery – Surgical oncology services (link)
- Gonzales, LA – 1104 W. Highway 30 (link)
- Houma, LA – Bayou Region campus (link)
- Metairie, LA – 2800 Veterans Memorial Blvd., Suite 140 (link)
- Opelousas, LA – 3983 Interstate 49 South Service Rd. (link)
- Alexandria, LA – 3516 North Blvd. B (link)
- Jonesboro, LA – Regional clinic (link)
- Minden, LA – Regional clinic (link)
- Natchitoches, LA – Regional clinic (link)
- Natchez, MS – Regional Cancer Center (link)
- Shreveport, LA – Cancer Center of Shreveport (link)
- Shreveport Specialty Services – Multidisciplinary specialty oncology (link)
- Slidell, LA – Regional clinic (link)
- Winnsboro, LA – Regional clinic (link)
- Zachary, LA – Lane Regional Medical Center partnership (link)

== See also ==
- Cancer treatment centers in the United States
- List of hospitals in Louisiana
