= St. Charles Parish Hospital =

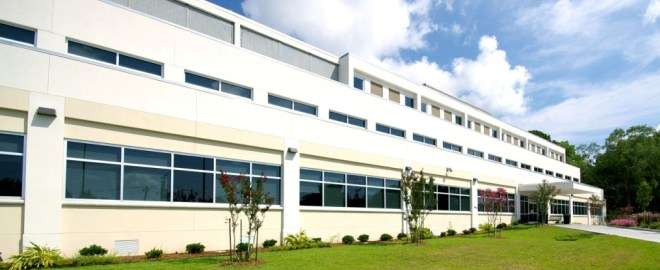

Geography
- Location: 1057 Paul Maillard Rd., Luling, Louisiana, United States
- Coordinates: 29.92409°N 90.37102°W

Organization
- Care system: Private
- Type: General
- Network: Ochsner Health System

Services
- Beds: 59

History
- Founded: 1959

Links
- Website: http://www.ochsner.org/locations/st.-charles-parish-hospital/
- Lists: Hospitals in Louisiana

St. Charles Parish Hospital is a hospital in Luling, Louisiana.

== History ==
The hospital opened in 1959 as a public hospital managed by the St. Charles Hospital Service District.

In 2014, the hospital became part of the Ochsner Health System, a private not-for-profit hospital system. Ochsner manages the hospital, but the St. Charles Hospital Service District maintained ownership of the facility.

== Facilities ==
The 260,000 square-foot hospital features 59-acute care beds. The facility is completely accredited by the Joint Commission of Health Care Organizations (JCAHO).

== See also ==
- List of hospitals in Louisiana
