= Linda R. S. v. Richard D. =

- Supreme Court of the United States

Argued December 6, 1972 Decided March 5, 1973
- Full case name: Linda R.S. v. Richard D. Et al.
- Citations: 410 U.S. 614 (more) 93 S. Ct. 1146; 35 L. Ed. 2d 536; 1973 U.S. LEXIS 99
- Argument: Oral argument

Case history
- Prior: 335 F. Supp. 804 (N.D. Tex. 1971)

Holding
- Appellant lacks standing because her monetary injury would not be redressed by criminal prosecution. Although appellant has an interest in receiving child support payments, she did not allege facts sufficient to show that her injury resulted from Texas's refusal to enforce Art. 602 against the child's father.

Court membership
- Chief Justice Warren E. Burger Associate Justices William O. Douglas · William J. Brennan Jr. Potter Stewart · Byron White; Thurgood Marshall · Harry Blackmun; Lewis F. Powell Jr. · William Rehnquist

Case opinions
- Majority: Marshall, joined by Burger, Stewart, Powell, Rehnquist
- Dissent: White, joined by Douglas
- Dissent: Blackmun, joined by Brennan

Laws applied
- Art. 602 of the Texas Penal Code

Linda R. S. v. Richard D., 410 U.S. 614 (1973), was a United States Supreme Court case resulting in a ruling that a particular section of a Texas Penal Code did not apply to mothers with out-of-wedlock children. The case was argued on December 6, 1972 and decided on March 5, 1973. Linda R. S., the petitioner and appellant, was the mother of the out of wedlock child. Richard D., the respondent and appellee, was the father of the out of wedlock child.

== Facts ==
Linda R. S., the mother of an out of wedlock child, brought an action to enjoin the "discriminatory application" of Art. 602 of the Texas Penal Code, providing that any "parent" who fails to support his "children" is subject to prosecution but by state judicial construction applies only to married parents. Linda R. S. sought to enjoin the local district attorney from refraining to prosecute the father of her child for not providing child support. The three-judge District Court dismissed the action for lack of standing.

== Decision ==
The Supreme Court affirmed the District Court's holding in a 5–4 decision. Justice Thurgood Marshall wrote the majority opinion, joined by Chief Justice Warren E. Burger and Justices Lewis F. Powell, Jr., Potter Stewart, and William Rehnquist. Citing Flast v. Cohen, the Court held that "in the unique context of a challenge to a criminal statute, appellant has failed to allege a sufficient nexus between her injury and the government action which she attacks to justify judicial intervention." In December 1981, in Leeke v. Timmerman, the Supreme Court affirmed the precedent in Linda R. S. v. Richard D.. Four judges wrote two separate dissenting notes.

== Justice White's dissent ==
Justice White, with Justice Douglas joining, wrote that "children born out of wedlock ... have been excluded intentionally from the class of persons protected by a particular criminal law. They do not get the protection of the laws that other women and children get. Under Art. 602, they are rendered nonpersons; a father may ignore them with full knowledge that he will be subjected to no penal sanctions."

== Justice Blackmun's dissent ==
Justice Blackmun, with Justice Brennan joining, saw "no reason to decide that question in the absence of a live, ongoing controversy because of Gomez v. Perez, 409 U.S. 535 (1973)."

== See also ==
- List of United States Supreme Court cases, volume 410
- Levy v. Louisiana: Supreme Court case involving malpractice by children out of wedlock
