= List of United States Supreme Court cases, volume 391 =

This is a list of all the United States Supreme Court cases from volume 391 of the United States Reports:

Case name	Citation	Date decided
Mathis v. United States	391 U.S. 1	1968
FPC v. Sunray DX Oil Co.	391 U.S. 9	1968
Interstate Circuit, Inc. v. Dallas	391 U.S. 53	1968
Peyton v. Rowe	391 U.S. 54	1968
Levy v. Louisiana	391 U.S. 68	1968
Glona v. Am. Guarantee & Liability Ins. Co.	391 U.S. 73	1968
Comm'r v. Gordon	391 U.S. 83	1968
Musicians v. Carroll	391 U.S. 99	1968
Bruton v. United States	391 U.S. 123	1968
Duncan v. Louisiana	391 U.S. 145	1968
Bloom v. Illinois	391 U.S. 194	1968
Dyke v. Taylor Implement Mfg. Co.	391 U.S. 216	1968
Joint Industry Bd. v. United States	391 U.S. 224	1968
Carafas v. LaVallee	391 U.S. 234	1968
United States v. United Shoe Machinery Corp.	391 U.S. 244	1968
First Nat'l Bank v. Cities Service Co.	391 U.S. 253	1968
Food Employees v. Logan Valley Plaza, Inc.	391 U.S. 308	1968
In re Whittington	391 U.S. 341	1968
Darwin v. Connecticut	391 U.S. 346	1968
Wilson v. Port Lavaca	391 U.S. 352	1968
Zwicker v. Boll	391 U.S. 353	1968
Seferi v. Ives	391 U.S. 359	1968
N. Am. Van Lines, Inc. v. United States	391 U.S. 359	1968
Goldblatt v. Dallas	391 U.S. 360	1968
Howard v. Ohio	391 U.S. 360	1968
Brooks v. Briley	391 U.S. 361	1968
Jackson v. Nelson	391 U.S. 361	1968
Walker v. California	391 U.S. 362	1968
Rubeck v. New York	391 U.S. 362	1968
FPC v. Pan Am. Petroleum Corp.	391 U.S. 363	1968
Branigin v. Duddleston	391 U.S. 364	1968
California v. Phillips Petroleum Co.	391 U.S. 365	1968
Brooklyn Union Gas Co. v. Standard Oil Co.	391 U.S. 366	1968
United States v. O'Brien	391 U.S. 367	1968
Puyallup Tribe v. Dept. of Game	391 U.S. 392	1968
Menominee Tribe v. United States	391 U.S. 404	1968
NLRB v. Marine Workers	391 U.S. 418	1968
Green v. County School Board of New Kent County	391 U.S. 430	1968
Raney v. Board of Ed.	391 U.S. 443	1968
Monroe v. Board of Comm'rs	391 U.S. 450	1968
World Airways, Inc. v. Pan Am. World Airways, Inc.	391 U.S. 461	1968
Rabeck v. New York	391 U.S. 462	1968
Garrison v. Patterson	391 U.S. 464	1968
Theatres Service Co. v. United States	391 U.S. 468	1968
National Bus Traffic Assn., Inc. v. United States	391 U.S. 468	1968
Cent. Bank & Tr. Co. v. United States	391 U.S. 469	1968
Ross v. California	391 U.S. 470	1968
Reading Co. v. Brown	391 U.S. 471	1968
Wirtz v. Hotel Employees	391 U.S. 492	1968
Witherspoon v. Illinois	391 U.S. 510	1968
Bumper v. North Carolina	391 U.S. 543	1968
Pickering v. Board of Ed. of Township High School	391 U.S. 563	1968
Sabbath v. United States	391 U.S. 585	1968
Watts v. Seward School Bd.	391 U.S. 592	1968
Kaiser Steel Corp. v. W. S. Ranch Co.	391 U.S. 593	1968
Johnson v. Florida	391 U.S. 596	1968
In re Fischer	391 U.S. 600	1968
Skolnick v. Moses	391 U.S. 600	1968
Claber Distributing Co. v. Rubbermaid, Inc.	391 U.S. 601	1968
Fosdick v. Hamilton Cnty.	391 U.S. 601	1968
Jackson v. Oliver	391 U.S. 602	1968
Heyman v. Michigan	391 U.S. 602	1968
Vaughn v. Rodriguez	391 U.S. 603	1968
Peart v. California	391 U.S. 603	1968
Ioannou v. New York	391 U.S. 604	1968
Bonnie v. Gladden	391 U.S. 605	1968
