= Food Employees v. Logan Valley Plaza, Inc. =

- Supreme Court of the United States

Decided May 20, 1968
- Full case name: Amalgamated Food Employees Union Local 590 et al., petitioners v. Logan Valley Plaza, Inc., et al., respondents.
- Citations: 391 U.S. 308 (more)

Holding
- A business in a privately owned shopping center cannot prevent labor picketing nearby with trespass laws.

Court membership
- Chief Justice Earl Warren Associate Justices Hugo Black · William O. Douglas; John M. Harlan II · William J. Brennan Jr. Potter Stewart · Byron White; Abe Fortas · Thurgood Marshall

Case opinions
- Majority: Marshall, joined by Warren, Douglas, Brennan, Stewart, Fortas
- Concurrence: Douglas
- Dissent: Black
- Dissent: Harlan
- Dissent: White

Laws applied
- U.S. Const. amends. I, XIV

Food Employees v. Logan Valley Plaza, Inc., 391 U.S. 308 (1968), was a United States Supreme Court case in which the Court held that a business in a privately owned shopping center cannot prevent labor picketing nearby with trespass laws.

== See also ==
- Marsh v. Alabama
