= Witherspoon v. Illinois =

- Supreme Court of the United States

Argued April 24, 1968 Decided June 3, 1968
- Full case name: William C. Witherspoon v. The People of the State of Illinois
- Citations: 391 U.S. 510 (more) 88 S. Ct. 1770; 20 L. Ed. 2d 776; 1968 U.S. LEXIS 1469

Holding
- Stacking the jury with only jurors who would choose the death penalty violates the Sixth Amendment because it is not an impartial jury or a cross-section of the community.

Court membership
- Chief Justice Earl Warren Associate Justices Hugo Black · William O. Douglas; John M. Harlan II · William J. Brennan Jr. Potter Stewart · Byron White; Abe Fortas · Thurgood Marshall

Case opinions
- Majority: Stewart, joined by Warren, Brennan, Fortas, Marshall
- Concurrence: Douglas
- Dissent: Black, joined by Harlan, White
- Dissent: White

Laws applied
- Ill. Rev. Stat., c. 38 s. 743, U.S. Const. amends. VI, XIV

Witherspoon v. Illinois, 391 U.S. 510 (1968), was a U.S. Supreme Court case where the court ruled that a state statute providing the state unlimited challenge for cause of jurors who might have any objection to the death penalty violated the constitutional right to an impartial jury.

== Background ==
Until 2011, capital punishment was legal in Illinois. In 1960, a Cook County jury found William C. Witherspoon guilty of the murder of a Chicago police officer, and he was sentenced to death. At the time, when empaneling a death-qualified jury, Illinois state law allowed the exclusion of any potential juror "who, on being examined, state[s] that he has conscientious scruples against capital punishment, or that he is opposed to the same".

During voir dire, 47 potential jurors had been excluded under the parameters of this law. Only five of the 47 had expressed complete opposition to the death penalty and said they would never vote to impose such a punishment. The others were excluded for indicating "conscientious scruples" of varying degrees against the death penalty, of whom only one was asked any subsequent questions about the exact nature of her views.

Witherspoon appealed his conviction, saying that the law led to a jury consisting only of those who affirmatively favored capital punishment, and argued that created an unrepresentative jury which was biased towards the prosecution. The Illinois Supreme Court upheld his conviction, and Witherspoon then appealed to the U.S. Supreme Court.

== Supreme Court ==
The court overturned Witherspoon's death sentence by a 6–3 vote. While they rejected the petitioner's argument that jurors who actively support the death penalty are necessarily biased towards the prosecution, they held that the Illinois statute created an unconstitutional bias towards capital punishment and deprived Witherspoon of due process. Writing for the majority, Justice Potter Stewart wrote:

Whatever else might be said of capital punishment, it is at least clear that its imposition by a hanging jury cannot be squared with the Constitution. The State of Illinois has stacked the deck against the petitioner. To execute this death sentence would deprive him of his life without due process of law.

The decision in this case would cause the Supreme Court of California to order a retrial on the penalty phase in the 1972 case of California v. Anderson, and when the case was heard for the third time, would find the imposition of the death penalty was unconstitutional on the grounds of the penalty being cruel or unusual punishment, in violation of the State Constitution. The decision would become national in scale when the U.S. Supreme Court also in 1972 ruled in Furman v. Georgia that all death penalty cases were in violation of the 8th Amendment's prohibition on cruel and unusual punishment.

== Aftermath ==
Witherspoon was resentenced to a prison term of 50 to 100 years; he was paroled in 1979, 19 years after his conviction, and moved to Detroit, where he died from cancer in 1990, at the age of 63.

== See also ==
- List of United States Supreme Court cases, volume 391
