= Our Lady of the Lake Ascension =

- Franciscan Missionaries of Our Lady Health System

Geography
- Location: 1125 W. Highway 30, Gonazles, Ascension Parish, Louisiana, United States
- Coordinates: 30.20963°N 90.93172°W

Organization
- Religious affiliation: Catholic Church

Services
- Beds: 78

Links
- Website: ololrmc.com/about-us/our-lady-of-the-lake-ascension
- Lists: Hospitals in Louisiana

Our Lady of the Lake Ascension, formerly St. Elizabeth Hospital, is a 78-bed Catholic community hospital in Gonzales, Louisiana, serving Ascension Parish. It is a member of the Franciscan Missionaries of Our Lady Health System (FMOL), and has operated as a unit of Our Lady of the Lake Regional Medical Center in Baton Rouge since 2019.

The hospital has 24-hour E.R. available. St. Elizabeth Physicians building also located at same address with a number of physicians and specialists.

The Franciscan Missionaries of Our Lady, a Catholic religious institute, took over the hospital in 2000. and the hospital joined the FMOL system in 2004. In 2018, it announced it would become part of the Our Lady of the Lake Regional Medical Center as a cost-cutting measure, to enable it to expand along with the parish's growth.
