= Our Lady of Lourdes Regional Medical Center =

- Franciscan Missionaries of Our Lady Health System

Geography
- Location: Lafayette, Louisiana, United States
- Coordinates: 30.150906°N 92.037194°W

Organization
- Type: General
- Religious affiliation: Catholic church

History
- Opened: 1949

Links
- Website: www.lourdesrmc.com
- Lists: Hospitals in Louisiana

Our Lady of Lourdes Regional Medical Center is a hospital located in Lafayette, Louisiana in the United States. It is one of several medical facilities established in the state during the early 20th century by the Franciscan Missionaries of Our Lady, a Roman Catholic religious order based in Calais, France. It is a wholly owned subsidiary of the Franciscan Missionaries of Our Lady Health System, which is the largest locally owned, not-for-profit health system in Louisiana.

== History ==
The hospital was originally established in 1949 at 611 St. Landry Street, not far from what is now the campus of the University of Louisiana-Lafayette. Its creation was chiefly due to the efforts of Monsignor A. F. Isenberg, a priest from the Catholic Diocese of Lafayette. In 1945, Isenberg was injured in an automobile accident and was treated at another Franciscan hospital, Our Lady of the Lake Medical Center in Baton Rouge. Isenberg subsequently convinced the Franciscans of the need for a hospital to serve the residents of the city and parish of Lafayette. Our Lady of Lourdes Hospital opened on August 1, 1949 with 50 beds. In 1958 a four-story addition was constructed, doubling the hospital's capacity to 110 beds and allowing expansion of surgery, emergency services, laboratory and radiology departments. In 1972, a four-story diagnostic center was added, enlarging the hospital's capacity to 255 beds as the first major expansion of a 20-year master plan.

In the mid-2000s, the hospital's leadership decided the hospital should relocate from St. Landry Street to a new, more modern facility elsewhere in town. This new medical center was to be built from the ground up for the latest in medical, communications and information technology as well as to facilitate modern medical techniques. The new complex was built during the years 2009-2011 and officially opened on Ambassador Caffery Parkway, on the city's south side, in July 2011.

News media accounts and the hospital's website describe the new Our Lady of Lourdes Regional Medical Center as the largest construction project in the city's history, incorporating 396,000 square feet of building space, 45 acres of land and employing over 1,200 persons, including over 400 active physicians. The cost of the new facility was US$211 million, of which US$28.5 million was spent on technological advancements. It has eight operating theaters (one of which is built for neuro-interventional surgical procedures), 18 emergency care rooms, 10 flex rooms which can be adapted to provide extra ER beds, 24 intensive care rooms and a "surgical hybrid suite" containing a C-arm radiographic fluoroscopy, telemedicine equipment and the only Maquet Magnus surgical table in the state. This allows angiography and other cath-lab procedures to be performed without moving the patient to an OR.
