= Levy v. Louisiana =

- Supreme Court of the United States

Argued March 27, 1968 Decided May 20, 1968
- Full case name: Louise Levy, Administratrix v. Louisiana through the Charity Hospital of Louisiana at New Orleans Board of Administrators, et al.
- Citations: 391 U.S. 68 (more) 88 S. Ct. 1509; 20 L. Ed. 2d 436; 1968 U.S. LEXIS 1629

Holding
- The right of recovery may not be denied merely because a person is the illegitimate child of the deceased, because such a law would violate the Equal Protection Clause of the Fourteenth Amendment.

Court membership
- Chief Justice Earl Warren Associate Justices Hugo Black · William O. Douglas; John M. Harlan II · William J. Brennan Jr. Potter Stewart · Byron White; Abe Fortas · Thurgood Marshall

Case opinions
- Majority: Douglas, joined by Warren, Brennan, White, Fortas, Marshall
- Dissent: Harlan, joined by Black, Stewart

Laws applied
- U.S. Const. amend. XIV

Levy v. Louisiana, 391 U.S. 68 (1968), is a decision of the Supreme Court of the United States. This decision deals primarily with the civil rights of illegitimate children, specifically regarding their ability to sue on a deceased parent's behalf. It held that the right of recovery may not be denied merely because a person is the illegitimate child of the deceased because such a law would violate the Equal Protection Clause of the Fourteenth Amendment.

== Background ==
Louise Levy was the mother of five children, all of them born out of wedlock. She cared for the children herself, maintaining with them a relationship much like any other typical household. After alleged malpractice by Levy's doctor at the Charity Hospital of Louisiana at New Orleans, Louise Levy died. The appellant, on behalf of Levy's children, sought damages for Levy's wrongful death as well as damages for an unsettled case that Levy had not lived to see settled.

The Louisiana District Court dismissed the suit. On appeal, the Court of Appeals affirmed the dismissal, citing Louisiana statute defining a "child" for the purposes of damage recovery as a legitimate child. As the children were born outside of marriage, the courts deemed that they had no standing to sue on Levy's behalf. The Court of Appeals also defended its affirmation, claiming that the law was sound because it furthered the government interest of maintaining morals and general welfare by discouraging bearing children out of wedlock. The Supreme Court of Louisiana denied certiorari, and the case was finally appealed to the US Supreme Court on constitutional grounds. Specifically, the appellant claimed that the Louisiana law violated the Fourteenth Amendment and so was invalid.

== Decision ==
The 6–3 decision in favor of Levy's children was delivered on Monday, May 20, 1968. Justice Douglas wrote the majority opinion, which was joined by Chief Justice Warren and Associate Justices Brennan, White, Fortas, and Marshall. The Court stated that the children involved in the case were clearly "persons" under the Fourteenth Amendment, which entitled them to its full protection.

The Court noted that while states enjoy substantial powers to make classifications, states are not permitted to classify in a way that constitutes "invidious discrimination against a particular class." The objective nature of the "invidious discrimination" test was not clearly outlined, but the Court stated that the classifications states made had to be at least rational.

The Court continued to note the deference historically given to the legislature regarding its ability to draft law. However, when basic civil rights are involved, the Court said that it freely struck down "invidious discrimination," even laws with "history and tradition on [their] side." One precedent cited was the decision the Court made in Brown v. Board of Education, a landmark case in American civil rights.

In the case at hand, the Court attacked the inappropriateness of the Louisiana statute and considered that the children's legitimacy had no bearing on their relationship to their mother. The statute was declared unconstitutional, and the decision of the lower courts was reversed.

Justice Harlan authored a dissenting opinion, which was joined by Justices Black and Stewart. Harlan said that the Court had come to its conclusion "by a process that can only be described as brute force." He found two of the Court's arguments to be "frankly preposterous," and another to be "rather far-fetched." He concluded the Louisiana statute served a rational and constitutionally acceptable purpose: "If it be conceded, as I assume it is, that the State has power to provide that people who choose to live together should go through the formalities of marriage and, in default, that people who bear children should acknowledge them, it is logical to enforce these requirements by declaring that the general class of rights that are dependent upon family relationships shall be accorded only when the formalities as well as the biology of those relationships are present." "I could not understand why a State which bases the right to recover for wrongful death strictly on family relationships could not demand that those relationships be formalized."

== See also ==
- Jefferson Parish Hospital District No. 2 v. Hyde: Supreme Court case involving bundled billing
- Linda R. S. v. Richard D.: Supreme Court case involving child support for children born out of wedlock
- List of United States Supreme Court cases, volume 391
