= Baton Rouge General Medical Center – Mid-City Campus =

Coordinates: 30.44938°N 91.15309°W

Baton Rouge General - Mid City, also known as Mid City or The General, is a long term care, not-for-profit, community-owned hospital located in Baton Rouge, Louisiana. This hospital, established in the early 1900s, was the first official hospital to operate in the region. The hospital offers many services, including skilled nursing, wound care, and physical therapy. The hospital's sister facility is Baton Rouge General Medical Center- Bluebonnet Campus.

== Emergency department ==
After years of financial struggle and $154 million from the state since 2012, Baton Rouge General announced the imminent closure of the Mid City emergency department on Tuesday, February 3, 2015. Due to the volume of uninsured patients seeking treatment, hospital losses were exceeding $2 million per month. During the COVID-19 pandemic, the hospital accepted state surge funds to reopen the ER on June 15, 2020, and support the region during the pandemic and has been open since.
