= Franciscan Missionaries of Our Lady University =

Private Catholic university in Baton Rouge, Louisiana

- Other name: FranU
- Former name: Our Lady of the Lake College (1923-2016)
- Type: Private university
- Established: 1923
- Accreditation: SACSCOC
- Religious affiliation: Catholic
- President: David Bellar
- Students: 1,228
- Undergraduates: 891
- Postgraduates: 337
- Location: Baton Rouge, Louisiana, United States; 30.4001°N 91.1105°W
- Campus: 150 acres (61 ha); Urban
- Colors: Yellow and Blue
- Nickname: Wolves
- Mascot: Wally
- Website: www.franu.edu

Franciscan Missionaries of Our Lady University, formerly Our Lady of the Lake College, is a private Catholic university in Baton Rouge, Louisiana, United States. It was founded in 1923 and is sponsored by the Franciscan Missionaries of Our Lady, North American Province. The university has an enrollment of approximately 1300 students. The university is owned by Our Lady of the Lake Regional Medical Center. It offers associate, bachelor's, master's, and doctoral degrees.

In February 2006, Sandra S. Harper joined the college as president. In 2007, she led a reorganization of the college's academic programs resulting in two schools: The School of Arts, Sciences and Health Professions and The School of Nursing. Harper left Our Lady of the Lake College in August 2013 to head McMurry University in Abilene, Texas. Tina Holland was named the president in April 2014. Soon thereafter, the college would become a university. In 2016, the school's name was changed to Franciscan Missionaries of Our Lady University.
