= Jefferson Parish Hospital District No. 2 v. Hyde =

- Supreme Court of the United States

Argued November 2, 1983 Decided March 27, 1984
- Full case name: Jefferson Parish Hospital District No. 2, et al. v. Edwin G. Hyde
- Citations: 466 U.S. 2 (more) 104 S. Ct. 1551; 80 L. Ed. 2d 2; 1984 U.S. LEXIS 49; 52 U.S.L.W. 4385; 1984-1 Trade Cas. (CCH) ¶ 65,908

Case history
- Prior: Hyde v. Jefferson Parish Hosp. Dist. No. 2, 513 F. Supp. 532 (E.D. La. 1981); reversed, 686 F.2d 286 (5th Cir. 1982); cert. granted, 460 U.S. 1021 (1983).

Holding
- The analysis of the tying issue must focus on the hospital's sale of services to its patients, rather than its contractual arrangements with the providers of anesthesiological services. In making that analysis, consideration must be given to whether petitioners are selling two separate products that may be tied together, and, if so, whether they have used their market power to force their patients to accept the tying arrangement.

Court membership
- Chief Justice Warren E. Burger Associate Justices William J. Brennan Jr. · Byron White; Thurgood Marshall · Harry Blackmun; Lewis F. Powell Jr. · William Rehnquist; John P. Stevens · Sandra Day O'Connor

Case opinions
- Majority: Stevens, joined by Brennan, White, Marshall, Blackmun
- Concurrence: Brennan, joined by Marshall
- Concurrence: O'Connor, joined by Burger, Powell, Rehnquist

Laws applied
- Sherman Antitrust Act

Jefferson Parish Hospital District No. 2 v. Hyde, 466 U.S. 2 (1984), was a United States Supreme Court case in which the Court held the analysis of the tying issue must focus on the hospital's sale of services to its patients, rather than its contractual arrangements with the providers of anesthesiological services.

In making that analysis, consideration must be given to whether petitioners are selling two separate products that may be tied together, and, if so, whether they have used their market power to force their patients to accept the tying arrangement. It set a permissive precedent in antitrust law, as some viewed tying as always anticompetitive.

== Rationale ==
Any inquiry into the validity of a tying arrangement must focus on the market or markets in which the two products are sold, for that is where the anticompetitive forcing has its impact. Thus, in this case, the analysis of the tying issue must focus on the hospital's sale of services to its patients, rather than its contractual arrangements with the providers of anesthesiological services. In making that analysis, consideration must be given to whether petitioners are selling two separate products that may be tied together, and, if so, whether they have used their market power to force their patients to accept the tying arrangement.

There is no evidence that the price, quality, or supply or demand for either the "tying product" or the "tied product" has been adversely affected by the exclusive contract, and no showing that the market as a whole has been affected at all by the contract. The case invokes the Clayton Antitrust Act of 1914, a notable piece of antitrust legislation.

== See also ==
- Levy v. Louisiana: Supreme Court case involving hospital in New Orleans
- List of United States Supreme Court cases, volume 466
