= Alton Ochsner =

American physician (1896–1981)

- Born: May 4, 1896; Kimball, South Dakota, U.S.
- Died: September 24, 1981 (aged 85); New Orleans, Louisiana, U.S.
- Education: Washington University in St. Louis; University of Wisconsin–Madison
- Known for: Founder of Ochsner Clinic
- Medical career
- Profession: Surgeon; medical researcher
- Institutions: Tulane University, Touro Infirmary, Ochsner Clinic
- Research: Surgery

Alton Ochsner Sr. (May 4, 1896 – September 24, 1981) was an American surgeon and medical researcher who worked at Tulane University and other New Orleans hospitals before he established The Ochsner Clinic. Now known as Ochsner Medical Center, the clinic is the flagship hospital of Ochsner Health System. Among its many services are heart transplants.

== Medical career ==
Alton Ochsner was raised in Kimball, South Dakota. He was recruited to Tulane from the University of Wisconsin–Madison. In 1927, he succeeded Rudolph Matas as professor and chairman of the Tulane Department of Surgery. Although Tulane did not have its own hospital at the time, Ochsner succeeded in organizing a surgical teaching programs at New Orleans Charity Hospital, an institution that provided clinical opportunities to Ochsner and his students. Ochsner's refusal to hire a friend of Louisiana governor Huey Long formed part of the background for Long's establishing another medical school, now the LSU Health Sciences Center, across the street from the Tulane University School of Medicine.

As a medical student at Washington University in St. Louis, young Ochsner was summoned to observe lung cancer surgery—something, he was told, that he might never see again. He did not witness another case for seventeen years. Then he observed eight in six months all being smokers who had picked up the habit in World War I.

As a teacher, he became renowned, perhaps notorious to his medical students and residents, for his intense verbal cross-examinations in the Charity Hospital amphitheater, or "bull pen" as it is known. He believed the psychologically taxing ordeal programmed students to perform well under stress and kept them on their toes. At Touro Hospital, one of his patients was jazz musician Muggsy Spanier, who credited Ochsner with saving his life and composed the tune "Relaxin' at the Touro" during his recovery.

In 1955, Ochsner injected his grandchildren with a polio vaccine to demonstrate the vaccine's safety. However, the vaccine led to both grandchildren contracting polio, resulting in the death of his grandson and his granddaughter being paralyzed. The grandchildren were two of the approximately 120,000 children who received doses of polio vaccine from Cutter Laboratories that had not been manufactured properly, resulting in approximately 40,000 children contracting polio, which spread to other members of the children's families and communities, resuling in hundreds of cases of paralysis and ten known deaths.

== Ochsner clinic ==
The Ochsner Clinic, which he cofounded, was one of the first to document the link between cancer and cigarette use. He pioneered the "war against smoking." His leadership in exposing the hazards of tobacco and its link to lung cancer remain one of his most important contributions. He maintained this association even though he was criticized and ridiculed by his peers. Known today as the Ochsner Medical Center, it is one of the United States's largest group practices and academic medical centers. In 1990 alone, the clinic had 650,000 outpatient visits.

== Personal life ==
In 1948, he was named Rex, King of Carnival. He was a member of The Boston Club. Ochsner was also involved in conservative politics, primarily within the Republican Party.

He sat on the Board of Directors of National Airlines.

Ochsner was director of the Information Council of the Americas. He presented a trophy to Juanita Castro, the sister of Fidel Castro, at an INCA gathering in January 1965. He sat on the board of directors of the publication Latin American Report and was also a member of the Cordell Hull Foundation.

Ochsner and his wife had four children.

== Awards ==
In 1962, Ochsner received the Golden Plate Award of the American Academy of Achievement.
