= Bumper v. North Carolina =

- Supreme Court of the United States

Argued April 24–25, 1968 Decided June 3, 1968
- Full case name: Bumper v. North Carolina
- Citations: 391 U.S. 543 (more) 88 S. Ct. 1788; 20 L. Ed. 2d 797

Case history
- Prior: State v. Bumpers, 270 N.C. 521, 155 S.E.2d 173 (1967); cert. granted, 389 U.S. 1034 (1968).

Holding
- Consent to enter a property based upon an officer's false assertion that they possess a warrant is invalid because it is not freely given

Court membership
- Chief Justice Earl Warren Associate Justices Hugo Black · William O. Douglas; John M. Harlan II · William J. Brennan Jr. Potter Stewart · Byron White; Abe Fortas · Thurgood Marshall

Case opinions
- Majority: Stewart, joined by Warren, Brennan, Fortas, Marshall (in full); Douglas, Harlan (Part II)
- Concurrence: Douglas
- Concurrence: Harlan
- Dissent: Black
- Dissent: White

Laws applied
- U.S. Const. amend. IV

Bumper v. North Carolina, 391 U.S. 543 (1968), was a U.S. Supreme Court case in which a search was struck down as illegal because the police falsely claimed they had a search warrant. This was tantamount to telling the subject that she had no choice but to consent. Justice Potter Stewart delivered the decision for the 7-2 majority.
