= Baton Rouge General Medical Center – Bluebonnet Campus =

Baton Rouge General Medical Center - Bluebonnet Campus

Geography
- Location: 8585 Picardy Ave., Baton Rouge, Louisiana, United States
- Coordinates: 30.39362°N 91.09485°W

Services
- Emergency department: Yes
- Beds: 201

Links
- Lists: Hospitals in Louisiana

Baton Rouge General Medical Center – Bluebonnet Campus is a 201-bed, private hospital at 8585 Picardy Avenue in Baton Rouge, Louisiana. The hospital offers various medical services, surgical procedures, and an Emergency Department. The hospital is a subsidiary of General Health System (GHS), the corporate parent of Baton Rouge General, that handles some administrative functions for the hospital. In addition to Baton Rouge General Medical Center, the GHS Organization includes Baton Rouge General Physicians, Baton Rouge General Medical Center's Foundation, and other programs spanning over the Capital city's nine-parish service area. Baton Rouge General Medical Center has three hospital locations: Baton Rouge General - Bluebonnet, Baton Rouge General- Mid City and Baton Rouge General - Ascension.

== Services ==
- Emergency Department
- OB/GYN
- Neonatal Intensive Care Unit (NICU)
- Intensive Care Unit (ICU)
- Baton Rouge General Cancer Center
- Medical/Surgical Care
