= Ochsner Medical Center – Kenner =

Ochsner Medical Center - Kenner
- Ochsner Health System
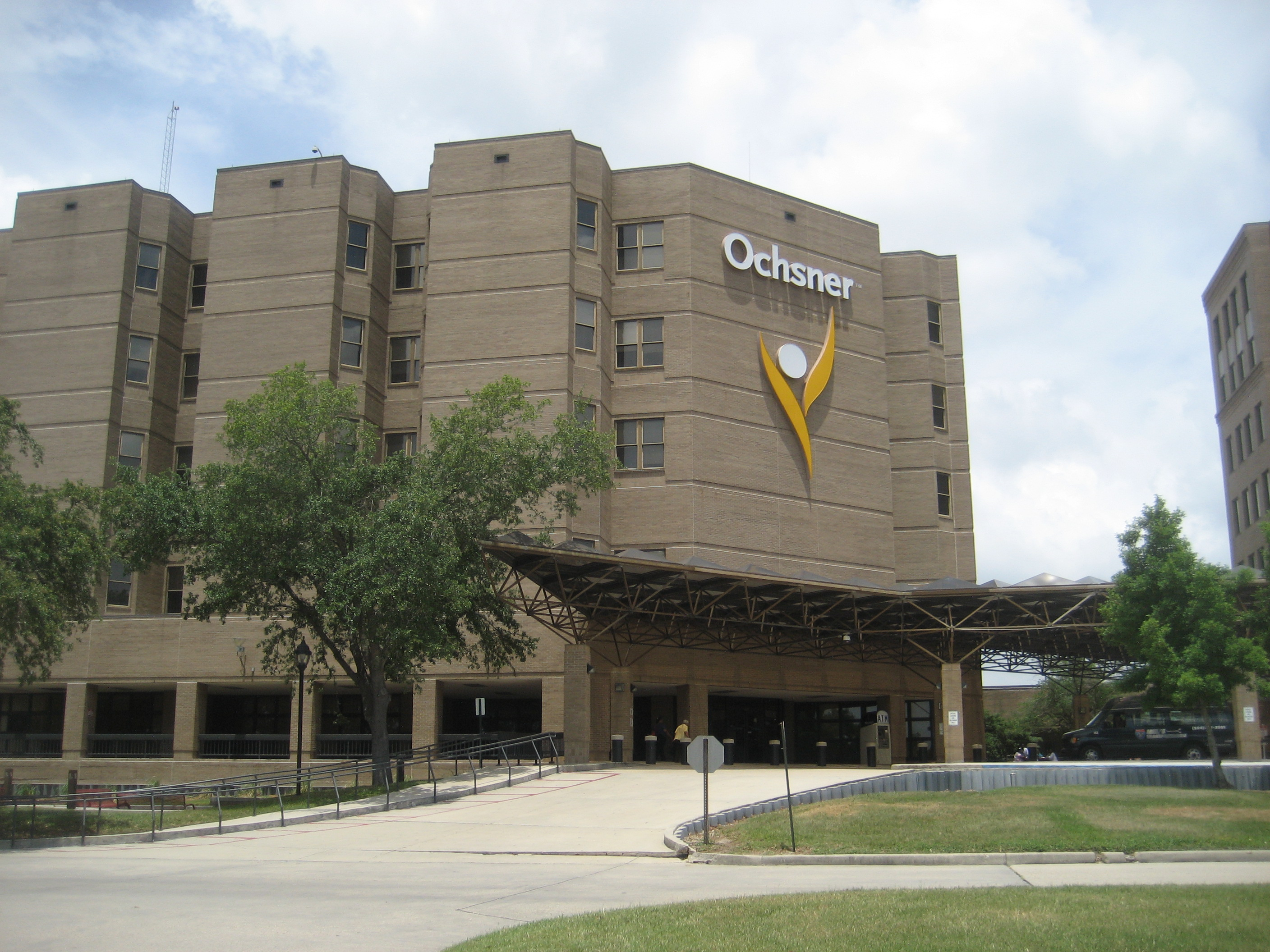

Geography
- Location: 180 W. Esplanade Avenue, Kenner, Louisiana, United States
- Coordinates: 30.025536°N 90.271897°W

Organization
- Funding: 501(c)3 Not-For-Profit
- Type: Community

Services
- Emergency department: Yes (Level II)

Helipads
- Helipad: Yes

History
- Opened: 1985 ( 35 years ago )

Links
- Lists: Hospitals in Louisiana

Ochsner Medical Center – Kenner, also called Ochsner Kenner, is a hospital in Kenner, Louisiana, United States.

The 170-bed hospital opened in 1985 as St. Jude Hospital and was later renamed Kenner Regional Medical Center. The hospital was run by Tenet Healthcare until 2006 when it was acquired by Ochsner Health System. After the acquisition, the hospital's name was changed to its current name.
