= Ochsner Medical Center =

Hospital in Louisiana, United States

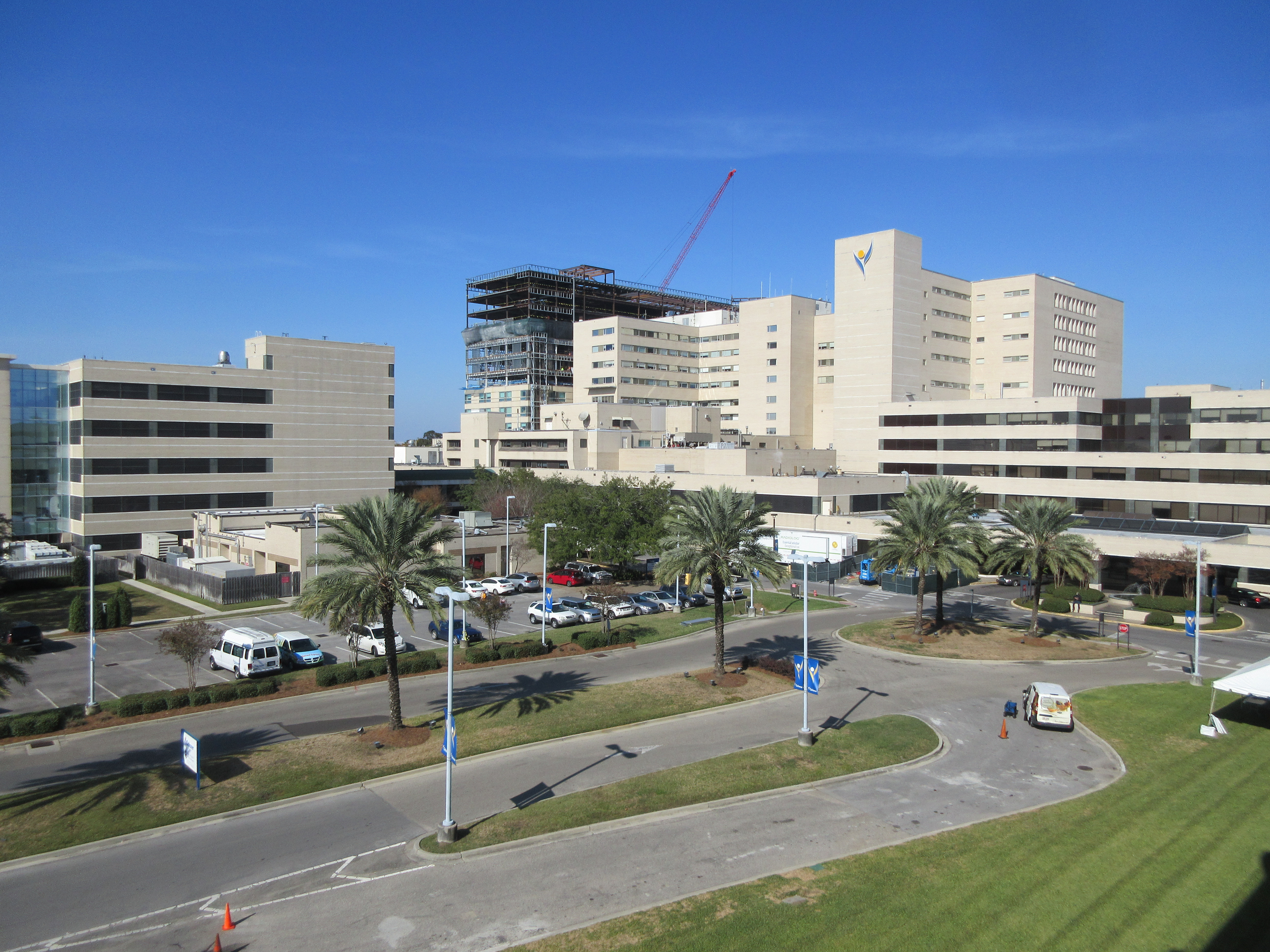
- Ocshner Medical Center

Geography
- Location: Jefferson, Louisiana, United States
- Coordinates: 29.963231°N 90.145370°W

Organization
- Care system: Private
- Type: General
- Affiliated university: University of Queensland School of Medicine, Tulane University School of Medicine, Louisiana State University Health Sciences Center

Services
- Beds: 767

History
- Founded: 1942

Links
- Website: http://www.ochsner.org/
- Lists: Hospitals in Louisiana

Ochsner Medical Center, historically also known as Ochsner Clinic, Ochsner Hospital, and Ochsner Foundation Hospital, is a hospital in Jefferson, Louisiana, a short distance from the city limits of New Orleans. It is a part of Ochsner Health System and hosts the organization's headquarters. Since 2019, it has been consistently rated one of the US' best hospitals by US News, and as the top hospital in Louisiana.

== History ==
As the flagship of the Ochsner Health System, the non-profit hospital was founded by Alton Ochsner, opening as "Ochsner Clinic" on January 2, 1942. In 2009, Ochsner Medical Center began a partnership with the University of Queensland School of Medicine in Brisbane, Australia for US citizens and permanent residents. Under the agreement, American medical students spend two years learning basic sciences at the University of Queensland in Australia and then two years of clinical rotations in the Ochsner Health System. The US cohort has achieved greater than a 90% match rate in the NRMP since 2009.

== Facilities ==
The hospital currently has 767 acute care beds and is completely accredited by the Joint Commission of Health Care Organizations (JCAHO).

It includes acute and sub-acute facilities; centers of excellence Ochsner Cancer Institute, Ochsner Multi-Organ Transplant Center and Ochsner Heart and Vascular Institute.

In 2010, it opened a new family birthing center in Baton Rouge.
