= LSU Health Shreveport =

Public medical school in Shreveport, Louisiana, US

Coordinates: 32.481014°N 93.761894°W

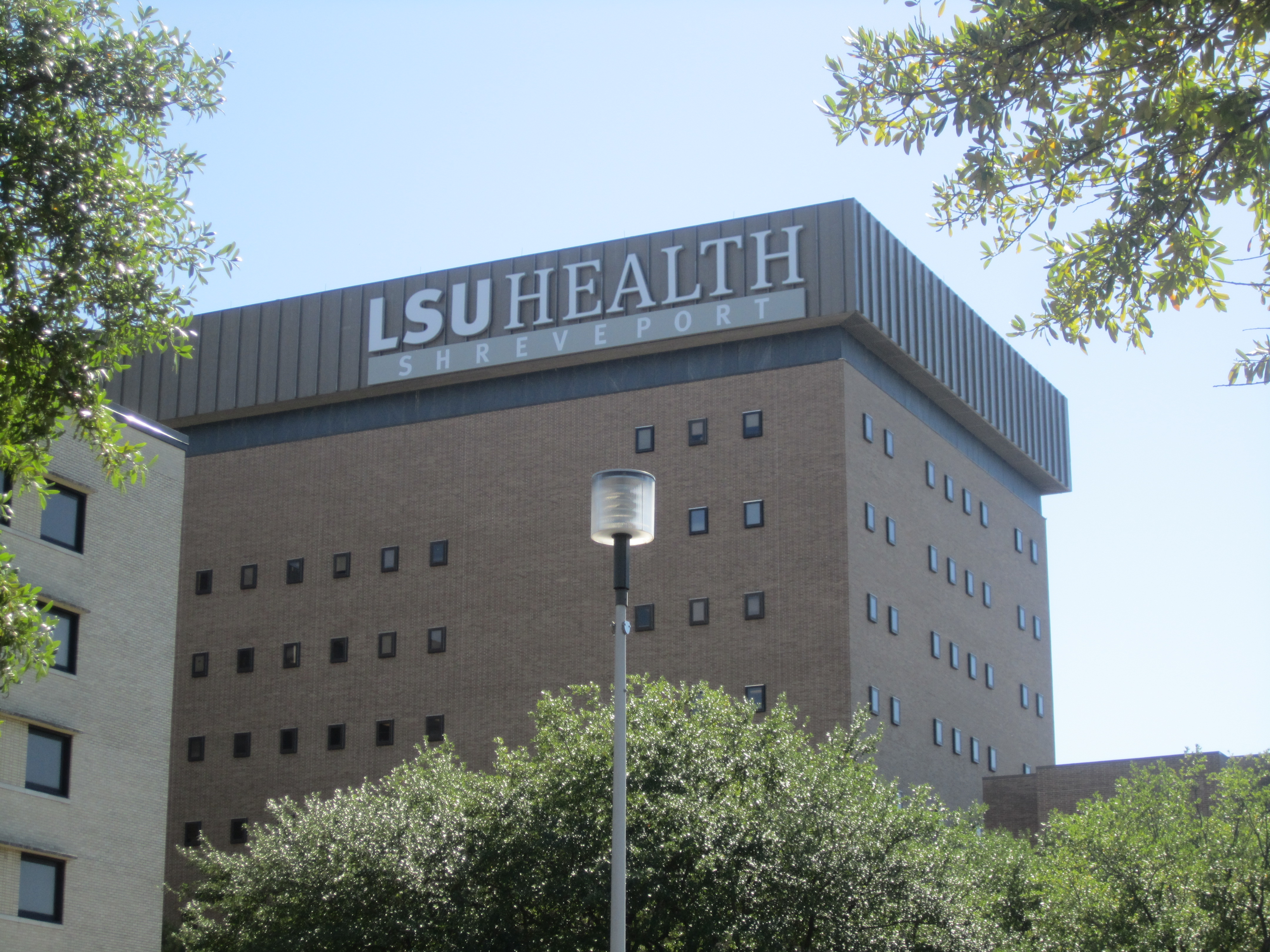
- Type: Public university
- Established: 1966
- Parent institution: Louisiana State University System
- Academic affiliations: Space-grant
- Chancellor: Lester Johnson
- Academic staff: 600+
- Students: 1101 (624 MD students)
- Location: Shreveport, Louisiana, United States
- Campus: Urban
- Website: www.lsuhs.edu

LSU Health Shreveport (LSUHS) is a public university focused on health sciences education and located in Shreveport, Louisiana. It is part of the Louisiana State University System and is composed of three schools: the School of Medicine, School of Graduate Studies, and School of Allied Health Professions. The School of Medicine offers the Doctor of Medicine degree, while both the Schools of Graduate Studies and Allied Health offer Bachelor's degrees, Master's degrees, and Doctorate degrees. The School of Medicine also offers 17 residency and 34 fellowship training programs through the Office of Graduate Medical Education.

== History ==
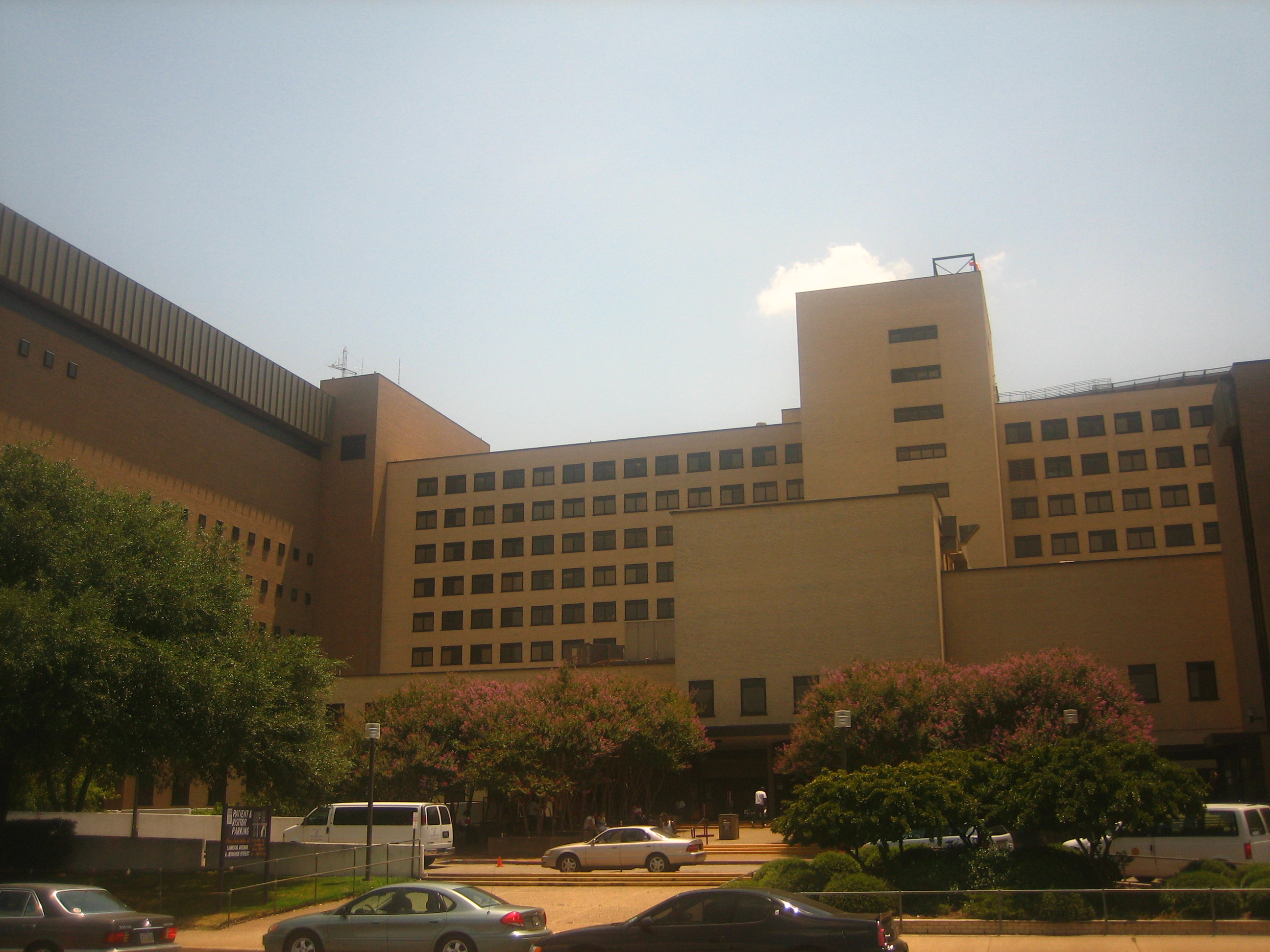
Close-up view of LSU Health Sciences Center Shreveport, which occupies the expanded facilities of the formerly-named Confederate Memorial Medical Center

Established in 1966 as the Louisiana State University School of Medicine at Shreveport, Edgar Hull – who in 1931 had worked to establish the Medical Center of Louisiana at New Orleans – served as the first dean until his retirement in 1973. G. E. Ghali was named Chancellor of LSU Health Shreveport in October 2016. Ghali left LSU Health Shreveport in June 2021. David Lewis, also dean of the School of Medicine, stepped in as interim chancellor. In January 2023, David Guzick took over as chancellor.

Since 2016, the LSU medical school in Shreveport has grappled with financial troubles. LSU President F. King Alexander said that the troubles date to 2013, when the private Biomedical Research Foundation of Northwest Louisiana assumed control of the teaching hospital as part of then-Governor Bobby Jindal's plan to privatize the state charity hospital system. Alexander said that the foundation has not paid hospital bills in full and provides insufficient funding to sustain the medical school.

In October 2018, LSU Health Shreveport formed a 50/50, public/private partnership with Ochsner Health. This new entity, Ochsner-LSU Health Shreveport is a branch of Ochsner Health System and serves the people of North Louisiana, a patient population of approximately 2 million.

== Academics ==
Undergraduate demographics as of Fall 2023
Race and ethnicity	Total
White	65%
Black	25%
Asian	5%
Hispanic	5%
Economic diversity
Low-income (Note: The percentage of students who received an income-based federal Pell grant intended for low-income students.)	16%
Affluent (Note: The percentage of students who are a part of the American middle class at the bare minimum.)	84%

LSU Health Shreveport consists of three professional schools: School of Medicine, School of Graduate Studies, and School of Allied Health Professions & Sciences.

=== School of Medicine ===
The School of Medicine confers the Doctor of Medicine (M.D.) degree through a four-year, system-based curriculum that integrates pre-clinical science with clinical training. Instruction occurs in the institution's Clinical Skills Center in the Center for Medical Education. Clinical rotations in years three and four are completed at affiliated Ochsner–LSU Health hospitals, including the Academic Medical Center, St. Mary Medical Center for Women and Children, Louisiana Behavioral Hospital, and Monroe Medical Center. Students may also pursue a combined MD–PhD program in collaboration with the School of Graduate Studies.

The Ochsner Physician Scholars Program offers selected students financial support in exchange for a post-residency service commitment within the Ochsner Health network. The medical school reported 99.2% of students matching into residency programs in 2024.

=== School of Graduate Studies ===
The School of Graduate Studies offers master's and doctoral programs in biomedical science and participates jointly in the MD–PhD program with the School of Medicine. Research at LSUHS is supported by the National Institutes of Health and other agencies, with concentrations in cardiovascular disease, cancer biology, neuroscience, and infectious disease.

=== School of Allied Health Professions & Sciences ===
The School of Allied Health Professions offers undergraduate, graduate, and post-professional programs. Undergraduate degree advancement options include RN-to-BSN and RRT-to-BS programs, while graduate offerings encompass the Doctor of Occupational Therapy (OTD), Doctor of Physical Therapy (DPT), Master of Communication Disorders (MCD), and Ph.D. in Rehabilitation Science. The school also offers three accredited physical therapy residencies and a doctoral internship in health service psychology.

Facilities include an anatomy lab, clinical simulation center, and on-site outpatient clinics such as the Children’s Center, Mollie E. Webb Speech & Hearing Center, and the Rehabilitation Clinic. Graduates of Allied Health programs consistently achieve high licensure pass rates and strong employment outcomes.
