= Ochsner Health =

American health care system

- Type: Private 501(c)(3) (non-profit)
- Industry: Health care
- Founded: January 2, 1942; 84 years ago New Orleans, Louisiana
- Founders: Alton Ochsner
- Headquarters: Ochsner Medical Center, Jefferson, Louisiana, United States
- Number of locations: 47 hospitals, 370 health & urgent care centers (2025)
- Area served: Louisiana, US Gulf Coast
- Key people: Pete November (president and CEO)
- Revenue: US$7.3 billion (2023)
- Number of employees: 40,000 (2025)
- Website: www.ochsner.org

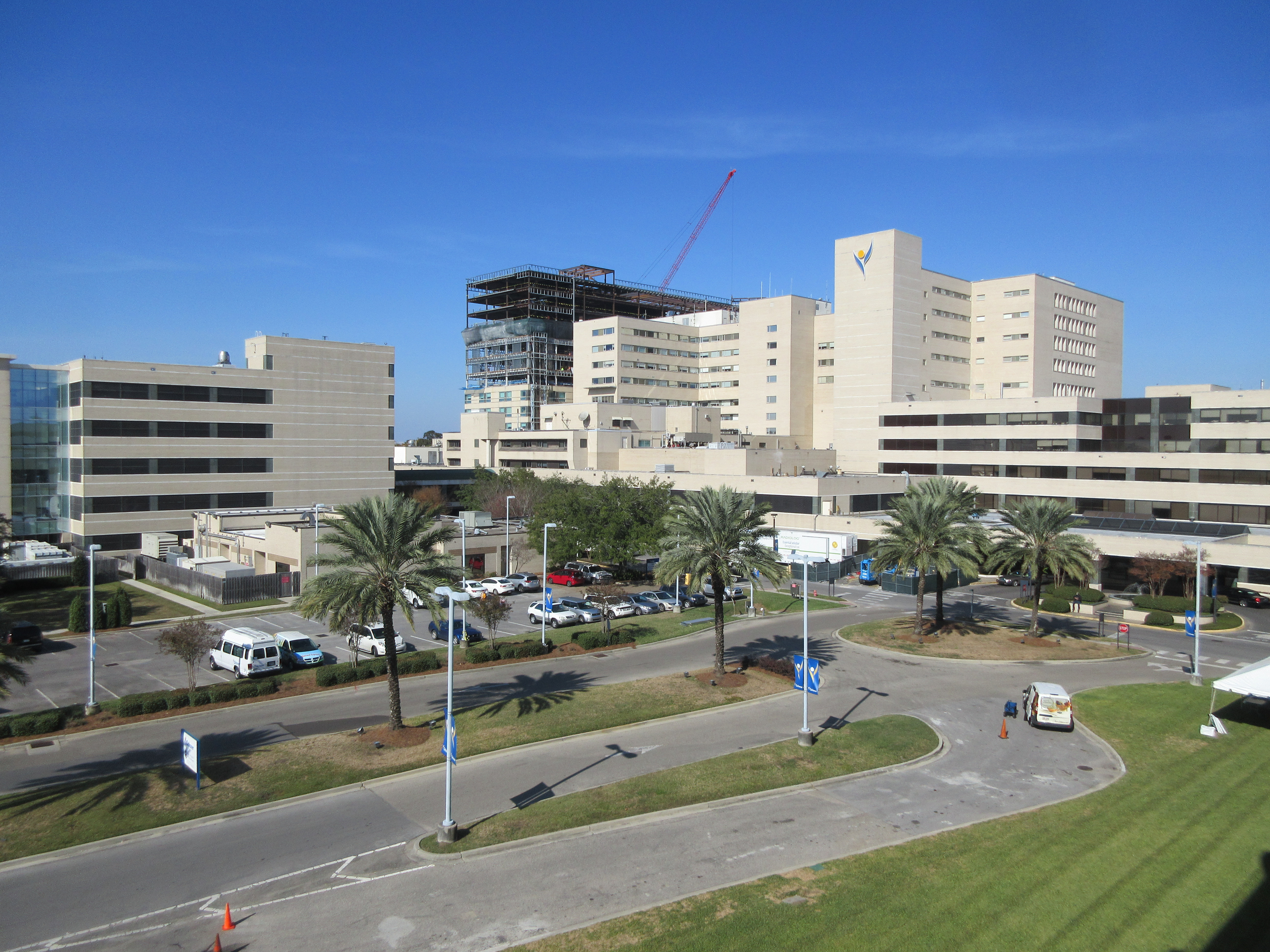
Ochsner Medical Center in Jefferson, Louisiana, which houses the administrative headquarters of Ochsner Health System

Ochsner Health is a not-for-profit health system based in the New Orleans metropolitan area of southeast Louisiana, United States. It is the largest non-profit, academic healthcare system operating in Louisiana, with over 4,900 employed or affiliated physicians, 47 hospitals and over 370 health and urgent care centers across the Gulf South. Its flagship hospital, Ochsner Medical Center, has been ranked the number one hospital in Louisiana for the past decade, and is among the largest hospitals in America. It also has other clinics and medical centers in Greater New Orleans, Baton Rouge, Shreveport, Monroe, Lafayette, Lake Charles, and other locations across Louisiana, Mississippi, and Alabama.

== History ==
Ochsner was founded by Dr. Alton Ochsner.

Adeptus Health reached an agreement with the Ochsner Health System to build and operate emergency rooms in Louisiana under the Ochsner name in September 2016.

During the COVID-19 pandemic in Louisiana, the Ochsner Health System was strained by surges in patient volume. In part, efforts to provide healthcare were complicated by resistance to vaccination among healthcare workers, and the effects of Hurricane Ida. In 2021 Oschner stated that employees with spouses who did not take the COVID-19 vaccine will pay more for health insurance.

Ochsner reported a drop of $74M in operating income in 2021, attributed to the effects of Hurricane Ida and the COVID-19 pandemic.

In June 2021, a significant Gulf Coast expansion was announced. Ochsner took over Rush Health System in Mississippi and Alabama.

In March 2026, the company began a collaboration with Cognito Therapeutics, combining its investigative Spectris non-invasive neuromodulation system with Ochsner's clinical network, to support the brain health and treatment of patients with Alzheimer's Disease.

== Ochsner Health System hospitals ==
Louisiana

- Ochsner Medical Center - Jefferson
- Leonard J. Chabert Medical Center - Houma
- Ochsner Baptist Medical Center (formerly Memorial Medical Center) - New Orleans
- Ochsner Hospital for Children - New Orleans
- Ochsner Medical Center – Baton Rouge (formerly Summit Hospital) - Baton Rouge
- Ochsner LSU Health Shreveport (formerly University Health) - Shreveport
- Ochsner LSU Health Shreveport - Monroe Medical Center (formerly University Health - EA Conway) - Monroe
- Ochsner Medical Center – Kenner (formerly Kenner Regional Medical Center) - Kenner
- Ochsner Medical Center – Northshore (formerly NorthShore Regional Medical Center) - Slidell
- Ochsner Medical Center – West Bank (formerly Meadowcrest Hospital) - Gretna
- Ochsner Medical Complex – Iberville - Plaquemine
- Ochsner St. Anne General Hospital (formerly St. Anne General Hospital) - Raceland
- St. Bernard Parish Hospital - Chalmette
- St. Charles Parish Hospital - Luling
- Ochsner Lafayette General Medical Center campuses (formerly Lafayette General Health System)
- Ochsner Lafayette General Medical Center (formerly Lafayette General Medical Center) - Lafayette
- Ochsner Abrom Kaplan Memorial Hospital (formerly Abrom Memorial Hospital) - Kaplan
- Ochsner Acadia General Hospital (formerly American Legion Acadia Post 15 Hospital) - Crowley
- Ochsner St. Martin Hospital (formerly Gary Memorial Hospital) - Breaux Bridge
- Heart and Vascular Center of Acadiana - Lafayette
- Ochsner Lafayette General Orthopedic Hospital - Lafayette
- Ochsner Lafayette General Surgical Hospital - Lafayette
- Ochsner University Hospital & Clinics (formerly LSU University Medical Center) - Lafayette
- Ochsner American Legion Hospital (formerly Jennings American Legion Hospital) - Jennings

Mississippi

- Ochsner Medical Center - Hancock - Bay Saint Louis
- Ochsner Rush Health - Meridian
