= Ochsner Medical Center – West Bank =

- Tenet Healthcare

Geography
- Location: 2500 Belle Chasse Hwy., Gretna, Louisiana, United States
- Coordinates: 29.884409°N 90.027597°W

Organization
- Type: General

Services
- Beds: 180

Links
- Lists: Hospitals in Louisiana

Ochsner Medical Center – West Bank is a hospital in Gretna, Louisiana, USA.

The 107-bed hospital opened in 1984 as Meadowcrest Hospital and was run by Tenet Healthcare. Following Ochsner Health System's acquisition in 2006, the hospital changed to its current name.
