= Our Lady of the Lake Regional Medical Center =

- Franciscan Missionaries of Our Lady Health System

Geography
- Location: 5000 Hennessy Blvd, Baton Rouge, Louisiana, United States
- Coordinates: 30°24′14″N 91°6′25″W

Organization
- Care system: Private
- Type: Regional
- Religious affiliation: Catholic church
- Affiliated university: Louisiana State University, Our Lady of the Lake College, Tulane University, St. Jude Children's Research Hospital

Services
- Emergency department: Level I Adult Trauma Center / Level II Pediatric Trauma Center
- Beds: 1,020+

History
- Opened: 1923

Links
- Website: http://www.ololrmc.com/
- Lists: Hospitals in Louisiana

Our Lady of the Lake Regional Medical Center (OLOLRMC) is a general medical and surgical facility located in Baton Rouge, Louisiana. It is a Catholic hospital member of the Franciscan Missionaries of Our Lady Health System (FMOLHS). The hospital is accredited by the Joint Commission, and it serves as a teaching hospital to Franciscan Missionaries of Our Lady University, Louisiana State University, Tulane University, and Southern University.

OLOLRMC is the dominant institution in healthcare in the Greater Baton Rouge area and the largest private medical center in Louisiana, with over 1,020 beds. In a given year, OLOLRMC treats approximately 25,000 patients in the hospital, and services about 350,000 persons through outpatient locations. It has a complement of almost 900 physicians and 3,000 staff members. The Lake also operates two nursing homes, has an affiliated cancer facility adjacent to the main hospital, and operates a number of outpatient services on its campus as well as in outlying locations.

== History ==
In 1911, Mother de Bethanie Crowley and five Franciscan Missionaries of Our Lady traveled to America, stating their desire to serve the sick and needy. Eight years after establishing a hospital in Monroe, Louisiana, Mother de Bethanie was invited to Baton Rouge by Monsignor Francis Leon Gassler of St. Joseph's Cathedral and a group of leading local physicians, to tour the downtown area in search of a suitable location for a hospital to serve the 22,000 residents of the small river town. Mother de Bethanie insisted on a location across University Lake from the original Louisiana State University campus.

In November 1923, the four-story brick structure of Our Lady of the Lake Sanitarium opened its doors to the city. However, in April 1978, the original hospital closed and a 460-bed facility on Essen Lane opened to better serve a population that had grown to the south and east of the original location. Throughout the years, the facilities have undergone expansion.

OLOLRMC is the only Catholic-sponsored hospital in the Greater Baton Rouge area and has the oldest unbroken ownership and affiliation of any area hospital, dating back to its establishment in 1923. It is aligned with three FMOLHS sister hospitals across Louisiana, including Our Lady of Lourdes in Lafayette, St. Francis Medical Center in Monroe, and St. Elizabeth Hospital in Gonzales.

== Children’s Hospital ==
In late 2019, Our Lady of the Lake Children's Hospital (OLOLCH) opened as the second free-standing children's hospital in Louisiana. The $230 million project began in 2016, with completion expected by late 2018, but due to fundraising delays was pushed back to 2019. Each area of the hospital was designed to echo a different part of Louisiana's diverse culture, landscape and natural resources.

With six floors, the hospital has more than 360,000 square feet containing 99 patient beds, five operating rooms, and three procedural rooms. It’s also home to the region’s only Level II pediatric trauma emergency department. The ED is staffed with dedicated pediatric emergency medicine physicians.

The children’s hospital is also home to one of eight expanded St. Jude Affiliate Clinics in the U.S. Its partnership with St. Jude Children's Research Hospital, offers hematology/oncology services and chemotherapy within its hospital for St. Jude patients.

OLOLCH is home to the only pediatric residency program in the Baton Rouge area.

== Services ==
OLOLRMC Cancer Center is Baton Rouge area's only peripheral blood stem cell transplantation program, and only high-dose Interleukin II chemotherapy treatment center in Louisiana. In regards to oncology, OLOLRMC also provides access to clinical trials. Overall, more open-heart procedures than any other hospital in Louisiana are done at OLOLRMC. Likewise, more joint procedures than any other Louisiana hospital. It is the only hospital in Louisiana with a Nuclear Medicine department accredited by ICANL (Intersocietal Commission for the Accreditation of Nuclear Medicine Laboratories). The hospital also manages a blood-donating service. OLOLRMC was the first hospital in the world to use an integrated radiology information system (RIS) and PACS to achieve a completely filmless environment.

== LSU Health Baton Rouge ==
LSU Health Baton Rouge is a division of Our Lady of the Lake that operates local clinics in Baton Rouge.
