= List of Tulane University people =

This is a list of notable individuals affiliated with Tulane University, including alumni of non-matriculating and graduates, faculty, former faculty and major benefactors. Some especially notable individuals also are listed in the main university article.

Individuals are sorted by category and alphabetized within each category. For alumni, the degree and year of graduation are noted when available.

== Alumni ==
Selected Tulane people

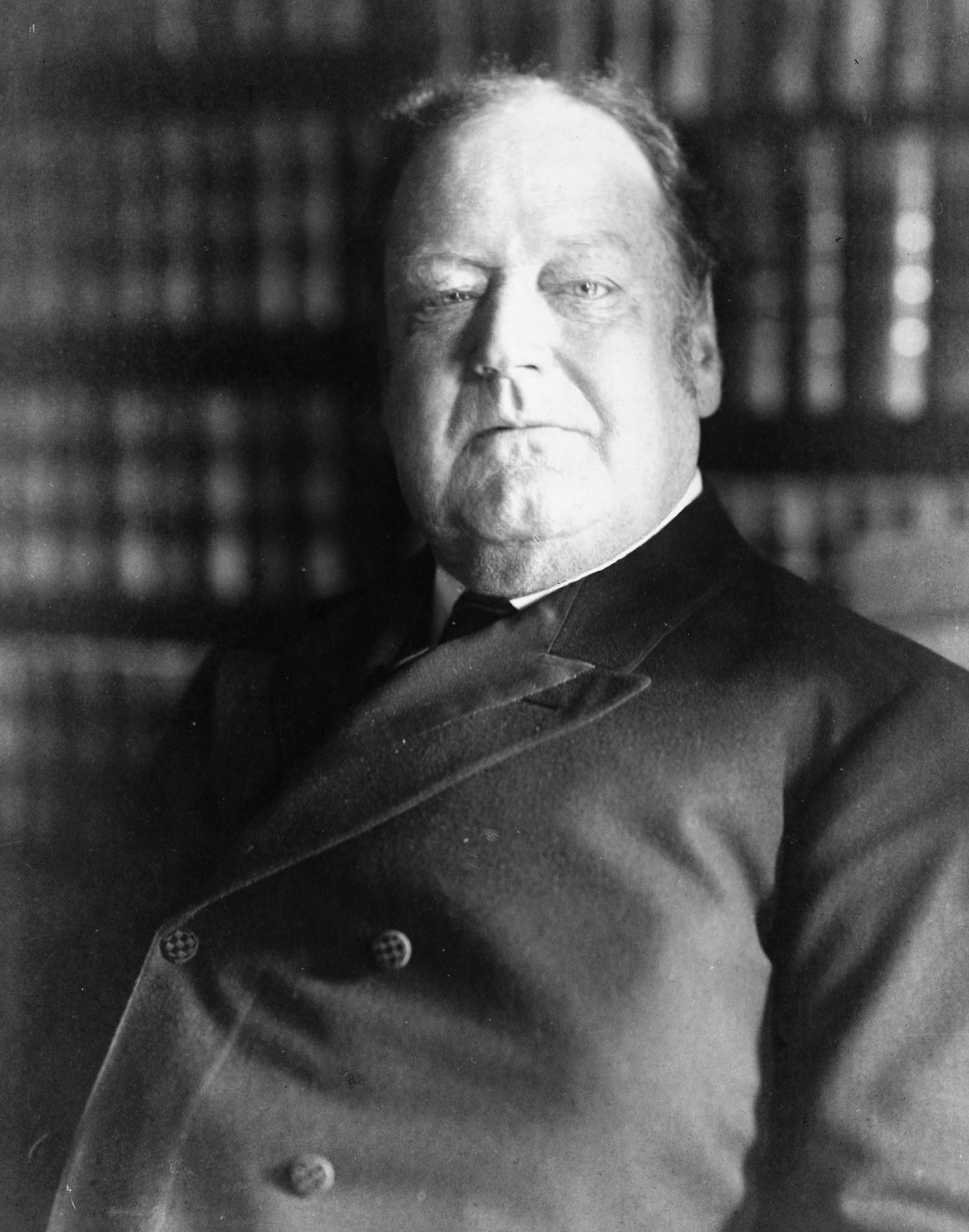
Edward Douglass White (Law 1868), 9th chief justice of the United States

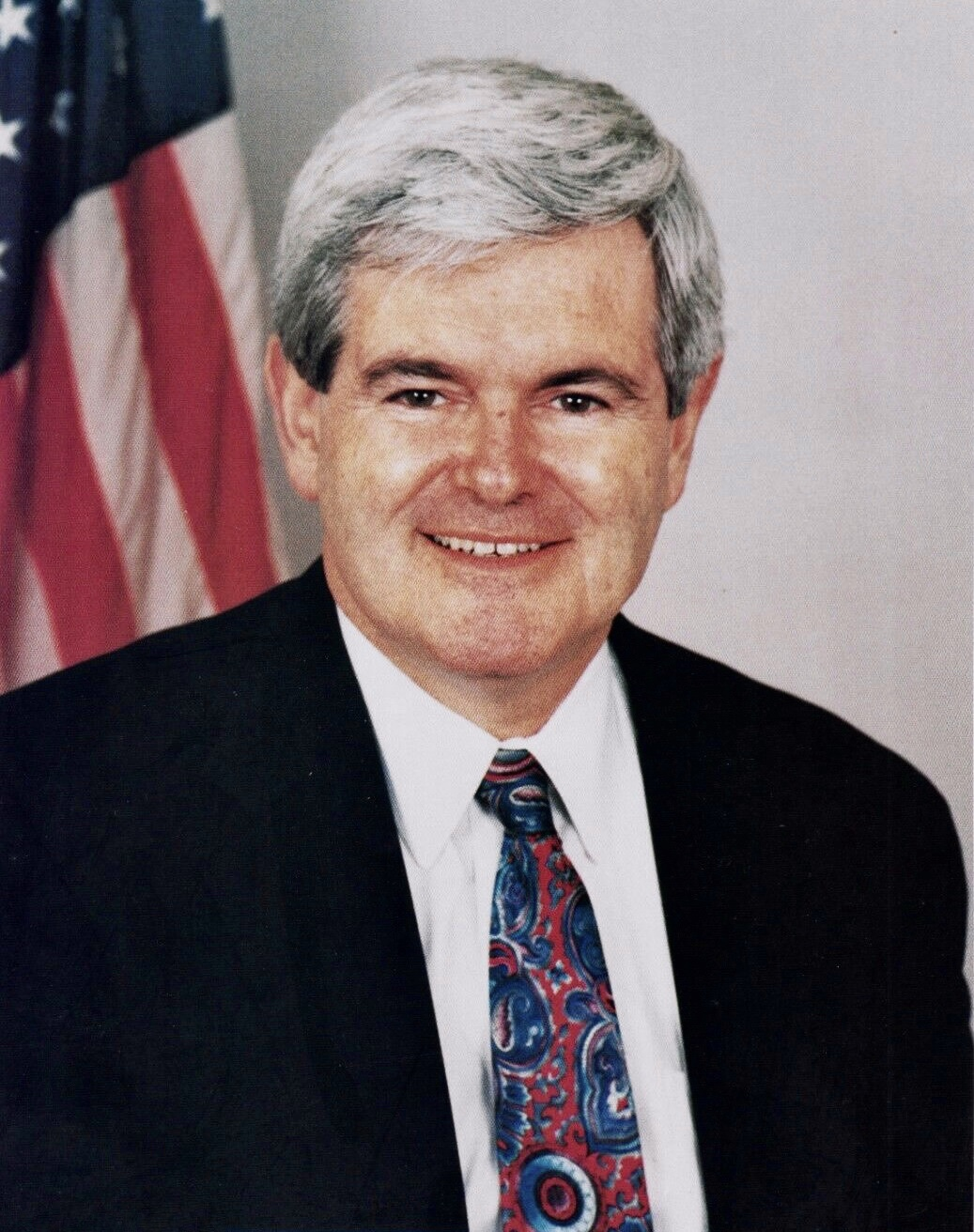
Newt Gingrich (M.A. 1968, Ph.D. 1971), 58th speaker of the U.S. House of Representatives

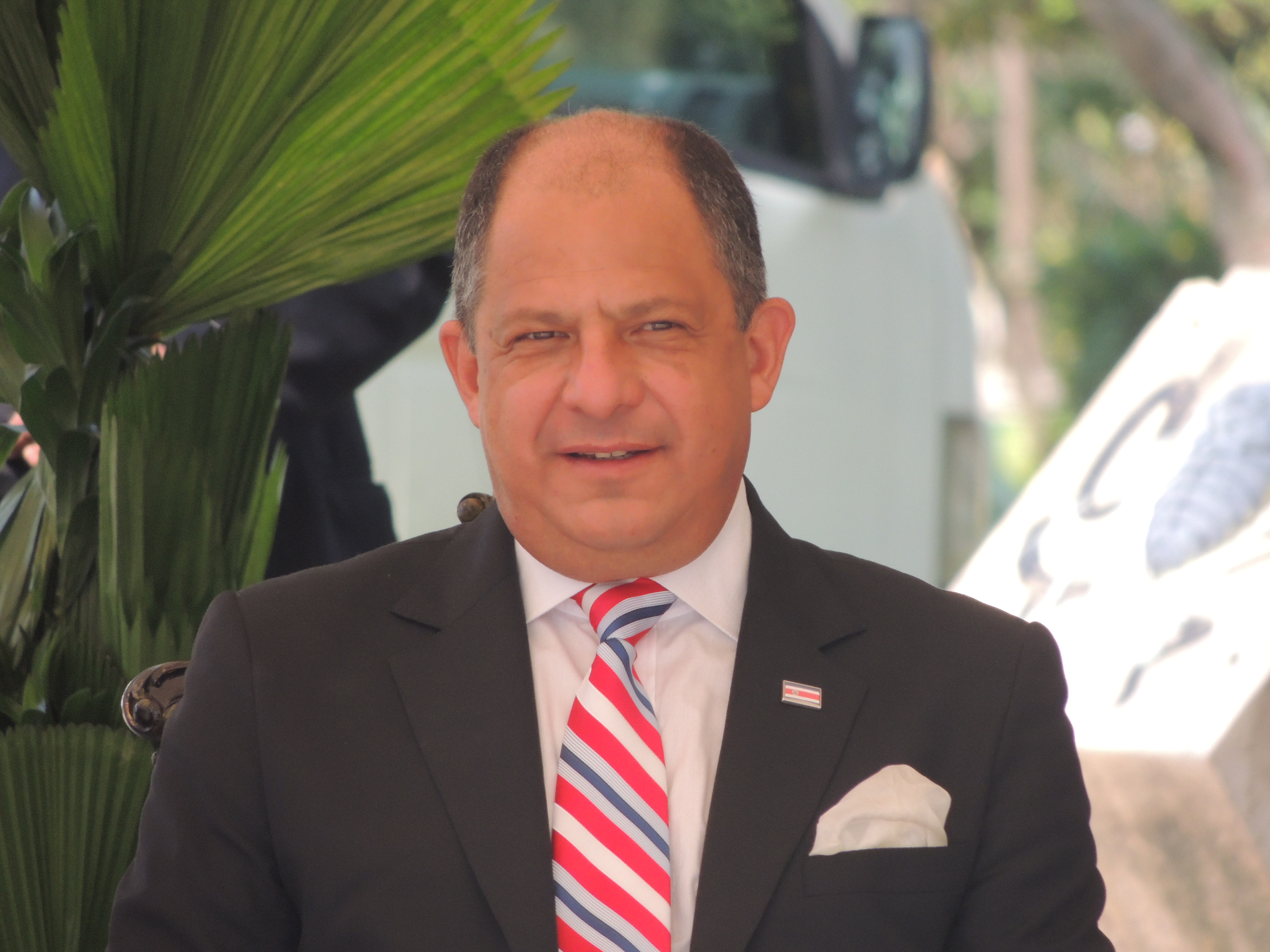
Luis Guillermo Solís (M.A. 1981), president of Costa Rica

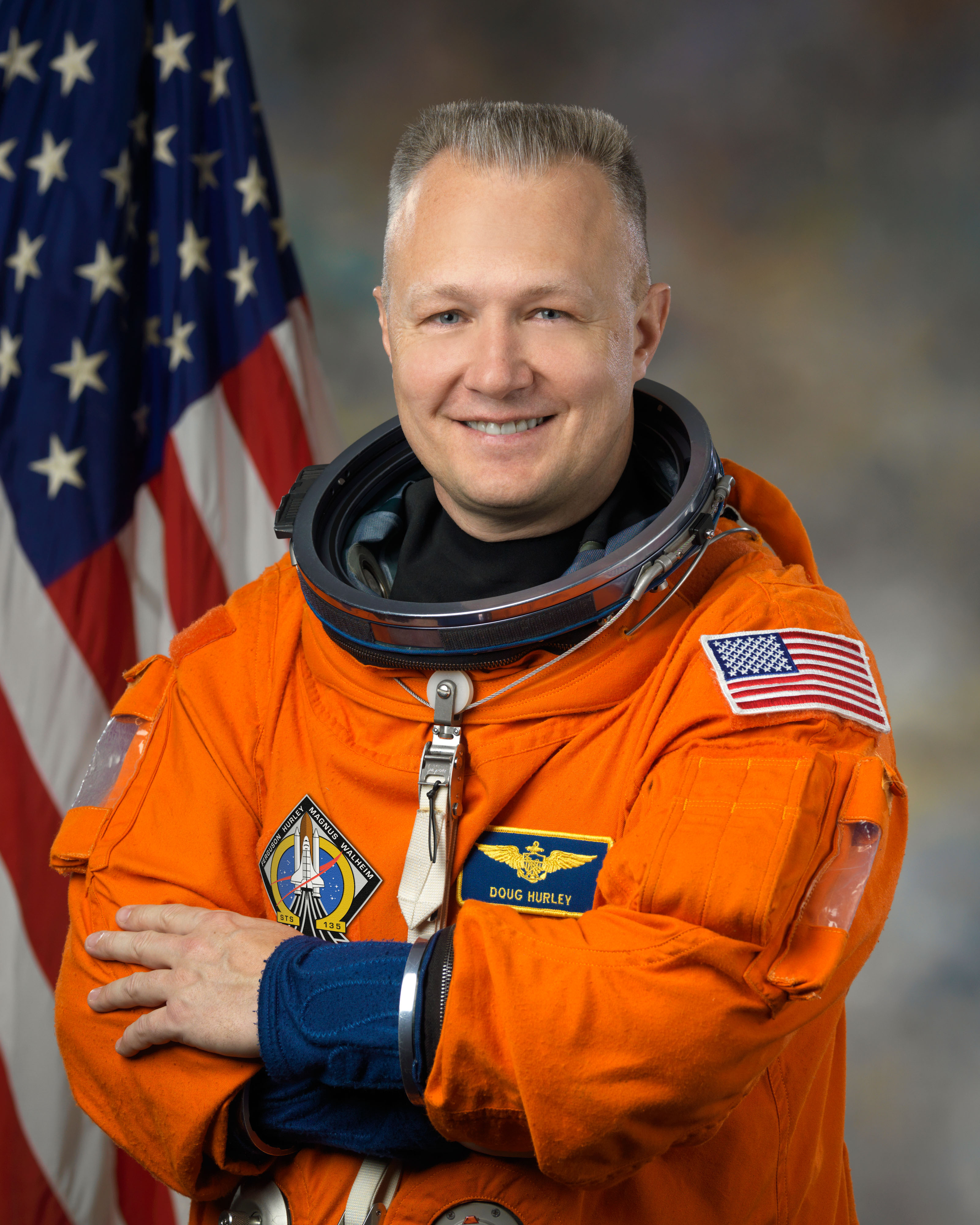
Doug Hurley (1988), astronaut

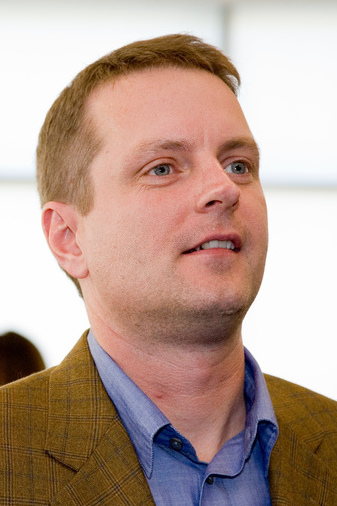
David Filo (B.S. 1988), co-founder of Yahoo!

=== Academia ===
- Donald Boesch, biologist/environmental scientist
- Ian Bremmer, political scientist
- Cleanth Brooks, literary critic
- Winston Chang, president of Soochow University
- John R. Conniff, New Orleans and Baton Rouge educator; president of Louisiana Tech University 1926–1928
- Light Townsend Cummins, Bryan Professor of History at Austin College in Sherman, Texas and former official State Historian of Texas
- James H. Dillard, professor and early advocate for education of African-Americans
- Edward F. Fischer, M.A. and Ph.D, professor of Anthropology at Vanderbilt University
- Mary Lynne Gasaway Hill, poet, writer, professor at St. Mary's University, Texas and fellow of the Royal Society of Arts
- James (Mac) Hyman, applied mathematician at Los Alamos National Laboratory in the United States
- T.R. Kidder, archaeologist
- Sang-don Lee, South Korean legal scholar
- Sarah Miller, health economist and winner of the 2022 ASHEcon medal
- John Mosier, historian
- Bradley Peterson, neuroscientist
- Blake Simmons, chemical engineer
- Frank Vandiver, Civil War scholar, acting president of Rice University 1969–1970, president of Texas A&M University 1981–1988
- Linda Wilson, 1957, former president of Radcliffe College

=== Arts and letters ===
==== Architecture ====
- Robert Ivy, CEO AIA
- Richard Koch, first graduate of the Tulane School of Architecture, architectural preservationist
- Albert C. Ledner, designer of National Maritime Buildings in New York City and many other commercial and residential projects
- Edward F. Neild, architect of the Harry S. Truman Presidential Library and Museum and many buildings in his native Shreveport and Louisiana
- Henry Hobson Richardson, inventor of Richardsonian Romanesque architecture
- Leonard Spangenberg, architect and apprentice of Frank Lloyd Wright
- A. Hays Town, architect

==== Film and television ====
- Marion Abramson, founder of WYES-TV
- Bryan Batt, BA 1985, actor
- Les Blank, BA 1958, MFA 1960, documentary filmmaker
- Marshall Colt, Class of 1970, psychologist and former actor
- Doug Ellin, A&S 1990, television writer/director, creator of HBO's series Entourage
- Evan Farmer, actor
- Paul Michael Glaser, BA 1966, actor, TV's Starsky and Hutch
- Carlin Glynn, NG-N ’61, actress, Tony Award winner
- Lawrence Gordon, 1958, producer of popular films such as Predator and Die Hard
- Karen Grassle, actress
- Robert Harling, movie screenwriter, producer and director
- Courtney Hazlett, A&S '99, columnist and celebrity correspondent for MSNBC
- Jonathan Hensleigh, Law, writer of Die Hard: With a Vengeance, Jumanji, Armageddon
- Rick Hurst, actor; A&S '68
- Lauren Hutton, 1964, actress; model
- Anthony Jeselnik, comedian
- Dave Jeser, A&S 2001, co-creator of Comedy Central's Drawn Together
- Anthony Laciura, G '79, actor
- Christian LeBlanc, 1980, actor
- Shannon Lee, daughter of martial arts legend Bruce Lee
- Elyse Luray, NC ’89, star of PBS' History Detectives
- Olga Merediz, NC '78, actress
- Linda Taylor Miller, 1976, actress
- Alicia Morton, actress
- Enrique Murciano, TC ’95, actor, TV's Without a Trace
- Ed Nelson, A&S ’53, UC ’00, actor, Peyton Place
- Matt Ogens, Academy Award-nominated and Emmy Award-winning director, Audible, MADU
- Bruce Paltrow, 1965, television and film producer
- Meryl Poster, Academy Award-winning and Emmy-nominated producer
- Michael Price, Emmy award-winning writer and producer best known for his work on The Simpsons
- Al Shea, actor and theatre critic
- Jerry Springer, B.A., 1965, talk show host and former mayor of Cincinnati, Ohio
- Harold Sylvester, actor, director
- Ian Terry, winner of the fourteenth season of Big Brother
- Ronald A. Weinberg, American-born Canadian children's television producer (Cinar)

==== Literature and poetry ====
- John Gregory Brown, novelist, 1982
- Amy Carter, G ’96, children's book author; daughter of former President Jimmy Carter
- Rich Cohen, writer, 1990
- Nicole Cooley, poet; Walt Whitman Award recipient
- Peter Cooley, poet
- Alcée Fortier, folklorist and recorder of the story of Br'er Rabbit
- Whitney Gaskell, Law 1997, novelist
- Shirley Ann Grau, 1950, Pulitzer Prize-winning author
- Jennifer Grotz, poet
- N. K. Jemisin, science fiction and fantasy writer, three time Hugo Award recipient
- John Reed, author, Snowball's Chance
- Leigh Richmond (1911–1995), writer
- John Kennedy Toole, BA 1958, author, Pulitzer Prize winner for A Confederacy of Dunces
- Dede Wilson, poet and author

==== Music ====
- Les Crane, pioneer in interactive broadcasting, co-creator of pop music "Top 40"
- Paul Crawford, jazz musician, music historian, and music arranger who served as associate curator of the Hogan Jazz Archive
- Odaline de la Martinez, composer and conductor; first woman to conduct a BBC Proms concert
- John Doheny, jazz saxophonist, band-leader, and historian
- Scott Greenstein, A&S '81, president of Sirius XM Radio
- Stella Lefty, singer-songwriter
- Zachary Richard, A&S '72, Cajun singer/songwriter and poet
- Emily Saliers (attended), singer
- Theo Hilton, indie folk musician of Nana Grizol and Defiance, Ohio
- Janice Torre, lyricist of the song "Paper Roses"
- Michael White, jazz historian and musician
- Noah Auerbach, DJ commonly known as “Bachh”,

==== Non-fiction writing and journalism ====
- Andrew Breitbart, '91, publisher and author
- Hodding Carter, journalist, Pulitzer Prize winner
- Christopher Drew, journalist and book author
- Bessie Alexander Ficklen (1861–1945), writer, poet, artist
- Robert Lane Greene, magazine journalist
- Ira B. Harkey Jr., Pulitzer Prize-winning journalist
- Nate Lee, B.A. 1978, writer, senior editor for Chicago's Newcity
- Margaret Burr Leonard, civil rights activist and journalist
- Bill Monroe, A&S '42, broadcast journalist, former host of Meet the Press
- Mike Sacks, editor, writer, 1990
- Thomas Sancton, editor, writer, civil rights journalist, teacher, 1935
- Howard K. Smith, television journalist
- Ali Vitali, author and television journalist
- Lawrence Wright, author, Pulitzer Prize winner, and journalist

==== Visual arts ====
- Lynda Benglis, N '64, sculptor
- Jacqueline Bishop, MFA, 1982, visual artist
- Deborah Czeresko, M.A., 1992, glass blower, won first season of Blown Away
- Jane Davis Doggett, 1952, graphic artist and pioneer designer of wayfinding and graphics systems for airports
- Mignon Faget, Newcomb 1955, artist, jewelry designer
- Mary Garrard, 1958, art historian
- Bryan Nash Gill, 1984, artist
- Gary Russell Libby, art historian, curator, museum director
- Sergio Rossetti Morosini, artist, conservator
- Frank Relle, photographer
- Wendi Schneider, Newcomb 1977, artist, photographer
- Hunt Slonem, B.A., 1973, artist
- Meredith Stern, B.F.A. 1998, artist
- Cora Kelley Ward, painter

==== Other ====
- Alice K. Bache (1903–1977), philanthropist and art collector
- Afowiri Fondzenyuy, philanthropist and long-distance marathon runner
- Joan Halifax, Zen Buddhist teacher and author of several books on Buddhism and spirituality
- May Hyman Lesser, medical illustrator
- Howard Scott Warshaw, video game programmer/designer and documentary filmmaker

=== Business and economics ===
- Matt Battiata, CEO, real estate economics expert
- Geoffrey Beene, fashion designer
- Peter Brack, entrepreneur, founder, business leader and investor
- Andrew Friedman, president of operations for the Los Angeles Dodgers
- Neil Bush, B.A., M.B.A., 1979, presidential brother, ex-savings and loan executive
- Philip J. Carroll, M.S., 1961, former CEO, Shell Oil Company and Fluor Corporation
- James H. Clark, founder of Silicon Graphics, Netscape, and WebMD
- Robert M. Devlin, B.A., 1964, CEO of American General
- Charles E. Fenner, founder of Fenner & Beane, a forerunner of Merrill Lynch
- David Filo, B.S. 1988, co-founder of Yahoo!
- Alfred Ford, great-grandson of Henry Ford
- Talia Goldstein, B.A. 2002, entrepreneur, company founder
- C. Jackson Grayson, professor at Harvard, Stanford and Tulane; member of the Nixon Cabinet
- Thomas M. Humphrey, PhD. 1970, economist
- Samuel Israel III, fraudulent hedge fund manager
- Judith Kent, B.A., business executive and philanthropist
- Jeff Klein - hotelier and real estate developer
- Dean Lombardi, J.D., president and GM of the Los Angeles Kings
- Peter McNamara, B.S. CEO, McNamara Enterprises Underground Casino & Book Broker
- Ricardo Salinas Pliego, M.B.A., 1979, one of Forbes' "World's Richest People"
- Muhamed Sacirbey, Bosnian-American businessperson
- Peter Schloss, chief executive officer, Broadwebasia; director, Giant Interactive (NYSE: GA)
- Aaron Selber Jr. B.B.A., 1950, businessman and philanthropist in Shreveport
- Fred L. Smith, president and founder of Competitive Enterprise Institute
- Paul Tulane, benefactor, philanthropist
- Sam Zemurray, benefactor

=== Government and politics ===
==== Heads of state ====
- Luis Guillermo Solis, M.A. 1981, president of Costa Rica
- José Raúl Mulino, LL.M, 1983, president of Panama

==== U.S. senators and congressmen ====
- William L. Armstrong, B 1958, former U.S. representative and U.S. senator from Colorado; president of Colorado Christian University (R)
- Howard Henry Baker Jr., 1945, U.S. Senate majority leader, White House chief of staff, U.S. ambassador to Japan (R)
- Hale Boggs, Law, 1937, U.S. representative, 1941–1943, 1946–1972; house majority leader (D)
- Lindy Boggs, Newcomb 1935, U.S. representative, 1973–1991, Tulane benefactor, U.S. ambassador to the Holy See, 1997–2001 (D)
- Edwin S. Broussard, U.S. senator from Louisiana (D)
- Donelson Caffery, Law, U.S. senator, 1892–1900 (D)
- James "Jimmy" Domengeaux, Law, Lafayette congressman and Cajun cultural spokesman (D)
- Allen J. Ellender, Law 1913, U.S. senator, agriculture committee chair; appropriations committee chair; President Pro Tempore 1971–72 (D)
- Newt Gingrich, U.S. representative, 1979–1998 and Speaker of the House, 1995–1998 (R)
- Tim Griffin, L '94, U.S. representatives from Arkansas (R)
- Felix Edward Hébert, U.S. representative, 1940–1977 (D); chair, House Armed Services Committee
- Bob Livingston, former U.S. representative, 1977–1999; chair, House Appropriations Committee, 1995–98 (R)
- Wiley Nickel, former U.S. representative, 2023–2025 (D)
- John H. Overton, Law, 1897, former U.S. senator from Louisiana (D)
- Cedric Richmond, L '98, U.S. representative from Louisiana's 2nd congressional district (D); former senior adviser to President Joe Biden
- Jared Y. Sanders Jr., U.S. representative (D), later States Rights Party
- Luther Strange, B.A. 1975, Law 1978, U.S. senator from Alabama, 2017–2018 (R)
- Suhas Subramanyam, U.S. representative, 2025–present (D)
- Gene Taylor, U.S. representative, 1989–2011 (D-turned-R)
- Dave Treen, U.S. representative, 1973–1980 (R)
- David Vitter, Law, former U.S. senator from Louisiana, 2005–2017; former U.S. representative, 1999–2005 (R)

==== U.S. governors ====
- Newton C. Blanchard, former governor of Louisiana (D)
- Murphy J. Foster Sr., governor of Louisiana (D)
- Michael Hahn, governor of Louisiana (D)
- Luther E. Hall, governor of Louisiana (D)
- Alvin Olin King, former governor of Louisiana (D)
- Richard W. Leche, former governor of Louisiana (D)
- Huey Long, Law, former governor of Louisiana (D, 1928–32)
- John McEnery, former governor of Louisiana (D)
- Francis T. Nicholls, governor of Louisiana (D)
- Pedro Pierluisi, B.A., 1980, governor of Puerto Rico, New Party for Progress
- Jared Y. Sanders Sr., former governor of Louisiana (D)
- Oramel H. Simpson, former governor of Louisiana (D)
- David C. Treen (1928–2009), former governor of Louisiana (R, 1980–84)
- Bob Wise, Law, 1975, former governor of West Virginia (D)

==== U.S. cabinet secretaries and other prominent federal officials ====
- Howard Henry Baker Jr., 1945, U.S. Senate majority leader, White House chief of staff, U.S. ambassador to Japan (R)
- Regina Benjamin, MBA 1991, Surgeon General of the United States (2009–13)
- Donald Ensenat, Law, 1973, White House chief of protocol
- Lisa P. Jackson, administrator of the Environmental Protection Agency (D) (2009–2013)
- Stephen Douglas Johnson, AB '85, L '88, U.S. House chief counsel for Financial Institutions and Consumer Credit (1995–98) and Bush White House senior advisor to the Office of Federal Housing Oversight (2001–03)

==== Diplomats ====
- Howard Henry Baker Jr. (1945), U.S. Senate majority leader, White House chief of staff, U.S. ambassador to Japan (R)
- Lindy Boggs, Newcomb 1935, U.S. representative 1973–1991, Tulane benefactor (D), U.S. ambassador to the Holy See, 1997–2001
- Kristie Kenney, G '79, U.S. ambassador to Thailand, former ambassador to the Philippines and Ecuador
- John Giffen Weinmann (A&S '50, L '52), former U.S. ambassador to Finland and chief of protocol in the White House
- Clint Williamson (L '86) U.S. ambassador-at-large for war crimes issues, UN envoy, White House policy official

==== Mayors ====
- Sidney Barthelemy, mayor of New Orleans (D, 1986–94)
- Ravinder Bhalla, J.D., mayor of Hoboken, New Jersey
- Paul Capdevielle, Law, mayor of New Orleans
- Sandra Frankel (née Applebaum), 1963, Arts and Sciences, former mayor of the Town of Brighton, NY (D)
- Ray Nagin, M.B.A. 1994, mayor of New Orleans (D, 2002–10)
- Robert Poydasheff, Law, former mayor of Columbus, Georgia (2003–2007) (R)
- Jerry Springer, B.A. 1965, former mayor of Cincinnati, Ohio and television personality
- T. Semmes Walmsley, Law, mayor of New Orleans (D)

==== City and state officials ====
- Buddy Caldwell, attorney general of Louisiana 2008–16; former district attorney in Tallulah (D)-turned-(R)
- Philip Ciaccio, state representative, New Orleans City Council member, state circuit judge 1982–1998
- John Elton Coon, state representative from Ouachita Parish; mayor of Monroe 1949–1956, and state fire marshal 1956–1964 (D)
- Grey Ferris, member of the Mississippi State Senate (D)
- Cameron Henry, member of Louisiana House (R)
- Adam Kwasman, B.A. Economics 2003, member of Arizona House of Representatives District 11; 2014 candidate for U.S. Congress (R)
- Karen Carter Peterson, former state senator and state representative; candidate for United States House of Representatives from Louisiana's 2nd District (D)
- Weldon Russell, state representative from Tangipahoa and St. Helena parishes 1984–1988; realtor in Amite (D)
- Jock Scott, B.A. Government 1969, member of the Louisiana House of Representatives
- Scott M. Simon, architect and state representative (R)
- Eric Skrmetta, attorney from Metairie, Louisiana; Republican member of the Louisiana Public Service Commission for District 1 (R)
- Chris Ullo, member of both houses of the Louisiana legislature 1972–2008 (D)

==== Other ====
- Hanan Al-Ahmadi, assistant speaker of the Consultative Assembly of Saudi Arabia
- Ashley Biden, social worker, activist, and daughter of President Joe Biden
- Amy Carter, '96, daughter of former President Jimmy Carter; children's book author (D)
- Jan Crull Jr., Law, 1990, former Native American rights advocate, Hill staffer, international investment banker; multi Marquis Who's Who biographee
- C. B. Forgotston, fellow of Tulane Institute of Politics, lecturer in law, political activist, state government watchdog
- Juan Manuel García Passalacqua, 1967, late leading political analyst in Puerto Rico (D)
- Pedro A. Gelabert, 1956, Puerto Rico secretary of Natural Resources
- Victor Gold, journalist and political consultant
- John Grenier, Birmingham, Alabama, lawyer and leader of the Alabama Republican Party (R)
- Supriya Jindal, E '93, B '96, first lady of Louisiana (R)
- Kwan Yuk-noan, member of Taiwan's Legislative Yuan
- Kenneth McClintock, Law, 1980, Puerto Rico's former senate president (2005–2008); former secretary of state/lt. governor (D) (2009–2013)
- Paul Morphy, L.L.B., 1857, chess prodigy and unofficial world chess champion
- Terry O'Neill, president of the National Organization for Women (NOW)
- Martha Gilmore Robinson (1888–1981), women's rights and civic activist

=== Law ===
==== U.S. Supreme Court justices ====
- Edward Douglass White Jr., Law, 1868, 9th chief justice of the U.S. Supreme Court (D)

==== Federal and state judges ====
- Edith Brown Clement, Law, justice, U.S. Court of Appeals for the Fifth Circuit (R)
- W. T. Cunningham, preparatory curriculum, Law, judge of the 11th Judicial District in Natchitoches and Red River parishes, member of the Louisiana House of Representatives 1908–1912 (D)
- W. Eugene Davis, Law, 1960, justice, U.S. Court of Appeals for the Fifth Circuit
- John Malcolm Duhé Jr., Law, justice, U.S. Court of Appeals for the Fifth Circuit (R)
- Martin Leach-Cross Feldman, B.A. 1955, J.D. 1957 Federal Judge (R)
- Rufus E. Foster, Law, 1895, U.S. Court of Appeals for the Fifth Circuit
- F.A. Little Jr., Class of 1958, former judge of the United States District Court for the Western District of Louisiana (R)
- Ángel Martín, Law, former associate justice of the Puerto Rico Supreme Court
- Tucker L. Melancon, Law, 1973, justice, 5th Circuit since 1994 (D)
- Judge Henry Mentz, U.S. federal district judge 1982–2005
- Bill Pryor, Law, 1987, justice, U.S. Court of Appeals for the Eleventh Circuit (R)
- Robert Reid, Law, 1875, justice of the Louisiana Supreme Court
- Christian Roselius, 1857, chief justice, Louisiana Supreme Court (D)
- Alvin A. Schall, Law, 1969, U.S. Court of Appeals for the Federal Circuit
- Nauman S. Scott, one of the first Louisiana U.S. District Court Judges to advocate desegregation (D)-turned-(R)
- Elizabeth Weaver, N ’62; L ’65, Michigan Supreme Court justice
- Jacques Loeb Wiener, justice, U.S. Court of Appeals for the Fifth Circuit
- John Minor Wisdom, Law, judge, U.S. Court of Appeals Fifth Circuit (R)

==== Attorneys ====
- Dean Andrews Jr., attorney convicted of perjury by Orleans District Attorney Jim Garrison
- Sean M. Berkowitz, 1989, chief prosecutor, Enron Task Force
- Terry Michael Duncan, lawyer killed in 1993 Russian constitutional crisis
- William T. Dzurilla, Law, 1981, international attorney and law clerk to U.S. Supreme Court Justice Byron White (1982–1983)
- Jim Garrison, Law, New Orleans district attorney (D, 1962–74) and state appeals court judge
- Marc Kligman, J.D. 1995, sports agent and criminal lawyer
- Jim Letten, L '79, U.S. attorney
- Leander Perez, Law, judge and district attorney of Plaquemines Parish in first half of twentieth century (D)
- Ira Sorkin, BA 1965, attorney for Bernard Madoff

==== Other ====
- Yaw Darko Asare, active justice of the Supreme Court of Ghana 2024–present
- William Suter, Law 1962, clerk of the U.S. Supreme Court 1991–present

=== Math, science and technology ===
- Jon-Erik Beckjord, paranormal investigator and photographer
- Ruth Benerito, Newcomb alumna and inventor of wrinkle-free cotton
- Delzie Demaree, 1889–1987, botanist and plant collector who taught botany at Tulane 1956–1958
- Willey Glover Denis, 1879–1929, Newcomb A.B. 1899, Tulane M.A. 1902. Biochemist; as assistant professor at Tulane Medical School, the first woman appointed as a faculty member of a major medical institution in the U.S.
- Anna Epps, microbiologist; possibly the first African-American woman with a PhD to lead a medical school
- Joseph Fair, virologist
- David Filo, B.S.C.E, co-founder of Yahoo!
- Kurt Mislow, 1944, professor of Chemistry at Princeton University
- Harold Rosen, B.S.E.E, 1947, engineer/inventor, famous for inventing the geostationary communications satellite
- Evelyn Walton Ordway (1853–1928), chemist, suffragist and professor at Newcomb College from 1887 until 1905
- Dave Winer, B.A, Mathematics, 1976, weblog and RSS pioneer, former Harvard Law School Berkman Center for Internet & Society fellow
- A. Baldwin Wood, B.S.M.E., 1899, engineer and inventor of the wood screw pump (1913) and the wood trash pump (1915)
- Ilya Zhitomirskiy, 1989–2011, student, co-founder of the social network Diaspora

=== Medicine ===
- James Andrews, M.D., orthopedic surgeon
- Dale Archer, B.A., 1978, M.D., doctor and television personality
- Jim C. Barnett, physician and surgeon from Brookhaven, Mississippi, member of Mississippi House of Representatives 1992–2008
- Charles C. Bass, MD, Tulane Medical School dean 1922–1940, researcher in tropical medicine, inventor of modern dental floss
- Regina Benjamin, M.B.A., 1991, U.S. Surgeon General under President Barack Obama; first African-American woman on the American Medical Association Board of Trustees
- Gerald Berenson, B.S. 1943, M.D. 1945, heart researcher, preventive medicine pioneer and founder of the Bogalusa Heart Study
- Cyril Y. Bowers, M.D., professor of medicine and medical researcher
- George E. Burch, M.D., 1933, cardiologist
- Benjamin Cabrera, physician
- Jay Cavanaugh, Ph.D, 1994, member of California State Board of Pharmacy 1980–90; director of American Alliance for Medical Cannabis, 2001
- Wallace H. Clark Jr., B.S. 1944, M.D. 1947, pathologist, cancer researcher
- Michael E. DeBakey, M.D., 1932, pioneer of modern medicine and recipient of the Congressional Gold Medal
- Theodore John Dimitry Jr. M.D. 1901, pioneer of modern optometry
- E. Wesley Ely, B.S., 1985; M.P.H., 1989; M.D., 1989, physician researcher of delirium at Vanderbilt University Medical Center
- Thomas Farley, New York City Health Commissioner
- Marion Spencer Fay, B.A., 1915; physician, president and dean, Woman's Medical College of Pennsylvania
- Elizabeth Fontham, M.P.H., 1978, D.P.H., 1983, cancer epidemiologist, public health researcher, and founding dean of the Louisiana State University Health Sciences Center New Orleans School of Public Health
- Robert I. Grossman, B.S., 1969, physician-researcher, dean of the NYU Grossman School of Medicine
- Debra Houry, M.D., M.P.H., former chief medical officer and deputy director for Program and Science of the Centers for Disease Control and Prevention
- Thomas Naum James, M.D., 1949, director, World Health Organization cardiovascular center
- Ruth L. Kirschstein, M.D., 1951, director, National Institutes of Health, for whom the Kirschstein NRSA grant program is named
- Abraham L. Levin, M.D., 1907, inventor of the Levin Tube, which is still used for duodenal drainage after surgery
- Rudolph Matas, M.D., 1880, "father of vascular surgery"
- William Larimer Mellon Jr., M.D., M ’53, founder of Albert Schweitzer Hospital, Haiti
- José Gilberto Montoya, founder of the Immunocompromised Host Service and works at the Positive Care Clinic at Stanford
- Kelly Overton, Activist
- Imperato Pascal, MPH & TM, author
- Steven M. Paul, B.S. 1972, M.D. 1975, neuroscientist and pharmaceutical executive
- Luther Leonidas Terry, M.D., 1935, U.S. surgeon general 1961–1965; chair of the committee that produced Smoking and Health: Report of the Advisory Committee to the Surgeon General of the Public Health Service
- Xiaobin Wang, M.P.H., 1987, molecular epidemiologist at Johns Hopkins Bloomberg School of Public Health
- Paul Wehrle, physician who helped develop of methods to prevent and treat polio and smallpox
- Charles B. Wilson, pioneer in pituitary tumor treatment; Cushing Medal recipient

=== Military ===
- George K. Anderson, general in the United States Air Force
- David H. Berger E '81, 38th commandant of the United States Marine Corps
- Wayne Downing, general in the US Army
- Douglas G. Hurley, NASA astronaut
- John L. McLucas, G ’43, secretary of the Air Force
- Richard I. Neal, general in the US Marine Corps
- Christina Maria Rantetana, MPH '97, rear admiral in the Indonesian Navy
- William Suter, Law 1962, general, US Army
- Tate Westbrook, captain, US Navy
- James C. Yarbrough, general in the US Army

=== Royalty and religion ===
- Jorge Bolaños, son of Nicaraguan President Enrique Bolaños
- Francis George, Ph.D., 1970, cardinal archbishop of Chicago
- James G. Heller, rabbi and composer

=== Sports ===
- Stephen Alemais, baseball player
- Michael Aubrey, baseball player
- David Mark Berger, A&S '66, NCAA champion, member of 1972 Israeli Olympic weightlifting team
- Jim Boyle, NFL offensive tackle
- Bubby Brister, NG-UC ’85, former NFL quarterback
- Bobby Brown, Medicine 1950, baseball player, president of the American League
- Janell Burse, basketball player in the WNBA
- Chris Bush, 2004, NFL receiver
- Andy Cannizaro, MLB shortstop and baseball All American
- Jerry Dalrymple, football All-American
- Quincy Davis, 2006, naturalised Chinese Taipei men's national basketball team player
- JaJuan Dawson, 1999, NFL receiver
- Burnell Dent, NFL linebacker
- Corey Dowden, NFL defensive back
- Barbara Farris, UC ’98, WNBA forward, New York Liberty
- Steve Foley, football, quarterback in 1973 season when Tulane beat LSU for the first time in 25 years; played in two Super Bowls with Denver Broncos
- Matt Forte, NFL running back
- Nolan Franz, NFL wide receiver
- Lester Gatewood, NFL center
- Tony Giarratano, MLB, Detroit Tigers
- Fred Gloden, NFL player
- Brandon Gomes, MLB, Tampa Bay Rays
- Jim Gueno, NFL linebacker
- Ryan Grant, NFL wide receiver who is currently a free agent
- Nickie Hall, football player
- Ruffin Hamilton, NFL linebacker
- Phil Hicks, NBA basketball player
- Rodney Holman, 1981, NFL pro bowl tight end with Cincinnati Bengals
- Linton Johnson III, 2004, NBA player
- Robert Kelley, NFL running back
- Thakarius "BoPete" Keyes, NFL cornerback
- Shaun King, 1999, NFL quarterback
- Dominik Köpfer, German tennis player
- Troy Kropog, 2009–present, NFL lineman, Tennessee Titans
- Eric Laakso, 1976 Tulane Athlete of the year, NFL offensive tackle; started in Super Bowl XVII for Miami Dolphins
- J. P. Losman, NFL quarterback
- Aaron Loup, MLB pitcher
- Seth Marler, B ’03, NFL kicker
- Lonnie Marts, 1990, NFL linebacker 1991–2001
- Tommy Mason, NFL running back
- Max McGee, NFL wide receiver; caught first touchdown pass in Super Bowl history for Green Bay Packers in Super Bowl I
- Sylvester McGrew, NFL defensive end
- Darnell Mooney, NFL wide receiver
- Mewelde Moore, NFL running back
- Ed Morgan, baseball player
- Kevin Mmahat, baseball player
- Steve Mura, baseball player
- Eddie Murray, UC ’80, NFL kicker
- Herman Neugass, track & field athlete noted for his boycott of the 1936 Olympic trials
- Phil Nugent, football player
- Micah Owings, MLB, Arizona Diamondbacks, Cincinnati Reds
- Richie Petitbon, NFL player (Chicago Bears, Los Angeles Rams) and coach (Washington Redskins)
- Michael Pratt, current Green Wave quarterback
- Tyjae Spears, current NFL running back
- Eddie Price, football player
- Patrick Ramsey, NFL quarterback
- Ham Richardson, 1955, tennis player
- Taylor Rochestie (born 1985), American-Montenegrin player for Hapoel Haifa of the Israel Basketball Premier League
- Cairo Santos, NFL kicker
- Andy Sheets, MLB shortstop
- Joe Silipo, football player in the CFL, USFL and NFL
- Jerald Sowell, NFL running back
- Mike Tannenbaum, former general manager, New York Jets (NFL)
- Eric Thomas, 1987, NFL defensive back 1987–1995
- Michael Thompson, PGA Tour golfer
- Paul Thompson, NBA player
- Dalton Truax, NFL tackle, Oakland Raiders
- Linda Tuero, tennis, winner of Italian Open
- John "Hot Rod" Williams, NBA player
- Roydell Williams, NFL wide receiver
- Frank Wills, MLB relief pitcher
- Josh Zeid, MLB pitcher

== Faculty ==
- Akira Arimura, professor of endocrinology
- William Balée, professor of anthropology and environmental studies
- Harry Blackmun, associate justice on the U.S. Supreme Court
- David Bonderman, founder of TPG Capital
- Elizabeth Hill Boone, professor of Latin American art history
- Christian M. M. Brady, targumist
- Ian Bremmer, political scientist
- Stephen Breyer, associate justice on the U.S. Supreme Court
- Douglas Brinkley, historian
- William Craft Brumfield, professor and historian of Russian art and architecture
- Florian Cajori, historian
- James Carville, political science
- Alfred H. Clifford, mathematician
- Harold Cummins, faculty 1919–1964, anatomist
- David John Doukas, clinical ethicist and professionalism scholar
- John Duffy, medical historian
- Giuseppe Ferrata, composer and professor of music
- Gordon G. Gallup Jr., faculty 1968–1975, developer of the mirror test for self-awareness (1970)
- Kenneth W. Harl, historian
- Melissa Harris-Perry, former professor of political science and anchor for MSNBC
- Maximilian Heller, rabbi, professor of hebrew and hebrew literature 1912–1928
- Helmut Otto Hofer, faculty 1965–1977, zoologist and comparative anatomist
- Andy Horowitz, historian, winner of Bancroft Prize (2021)
- Louis J. Ignarro, faculty 1973–1985; Nobel Prize in Physiology or Medicine, 1998
- Walter Isaacson, author and former CEO of CNN; member of the Board of Tulane
- Barbara Jazwinski, head of the Composition Program at the Newcomb Music Department
- T.R. Kidder, archaeologist
- James A. Knight, M.D., former faculty, psychiatrist, theologian, and medical ethicist
- Adrienne Koch, historian
- Ida Kohlmeyer, artist and associate on faculty, 1950s
- Kris Lane, historian and author, Tulane University and University of Minnesota faculty
- Robert K. Merton, sociologist, former head of the Sociology Department
- Claire Messud, novelist
- Alton Ochsner, founder of Ochsner Clinic, pioneer anti-smoking advocate
- William Rehnquist, justice on the U.S. Supreme Court
- John Leonard Riddell, faculty 1836–1865; microscopist, chemist, botanist, geologist, physician, inventor of the first practical mono-objective binocular microscope (1851)
- Charles P. Roland, historian of the American Civil War and the American South, professor at Tulane 1952–1970
- Tom Sancton, journalist, musician, Andrew W. Mellon Professor
- Antonin Scalia, associate justice on the U.S. Supreme Court
- Andrew V. Schally, faculty 1962–2006, Nobel Prize in Physiology or Medicine (1977), French Legion of Honor
- J. Lawrence Smith, chemist and inventor of the inverted microscope (1850)
- Raymond Taras, faculty, political scientist
- Thomas W. Sherry, professor emeritus
- Royal D. Suttkus, faculty 1950–1990, founder of the largest ichthyology collection in the world
- Andrea Talentino, assistant professor of political science 1999–2005, ninth president of Augustana College
- Lewis Thomas, faculty 1948–1950, physician, researcher, and essayist
- Frank J. Tipler, physicist and author
- Jesmyn Ward, novelist; two-time winner of the National Book Award for Fiction (2011 and 2017)

== Tulane presidents ==
President	Years
Francis Lister Hawks**	1847–1849
Theodore Howard McCaleb**	1850–1862
University closed during the Civil War	1862–1865
Thomas Hunt**	1865–1867
Randell Hunt**	1867–1884
William Preston Johnston	1884–1899
William Oscar Rogers	1899–1900 (acting)
Edwin Alderman	1900–1904
Edwin Boone Craighead	1904–1912
Robert Sharp	1912–1913 (acting); 1913–1918
Albert Bledsoe Dinwiddie	1918–1935
Douglas Smith Anderson	1935–1936 (acting)
Robert Leonval Menuet	1936–1937 (acting)
Rufus Carrollton Harris	1937–1960
Maxwell Edward Lapham	1960 (acting)
Herbert Eugene Longenecker	1960–1975
Sheldon Hackney	1975–1980
Eamon Kelly	1980–1981 (acting); 1981–1998
Scott Cowen	1998–2014
Michael Fitts	2014–present
** denotes presidents of the University of Louisiana
