= Febres =

Febres is a surname. Notable people with the surname include:

- Carmen Febres-Cordero de Ballén (1829–1893), Venezuelan writer, poet
- George Febres (1943), an Ecuadorian-born painter
- Héctor Febres (d. 2007), an Argentinean navy officer
- León de Febres Cordero (1797–1872), a Venezuelan Army commander
- León Febres Cordero (1931 – 2008), former President of Ecuador Mayra Santos-Febres
- Mayra Santos-Febres (b. 1966 ), a Puerto Rican author, poet, novelist, and literary critic
- Miguel Febres Cordero (1854–1910), religious education leader

== See also ==
- Febre, another surname
- Febres (Cantanhede), a civil parish in the municipality of Cantanhede
