= Alan C. Pope High School =

Public high school in Marietta, Georgia

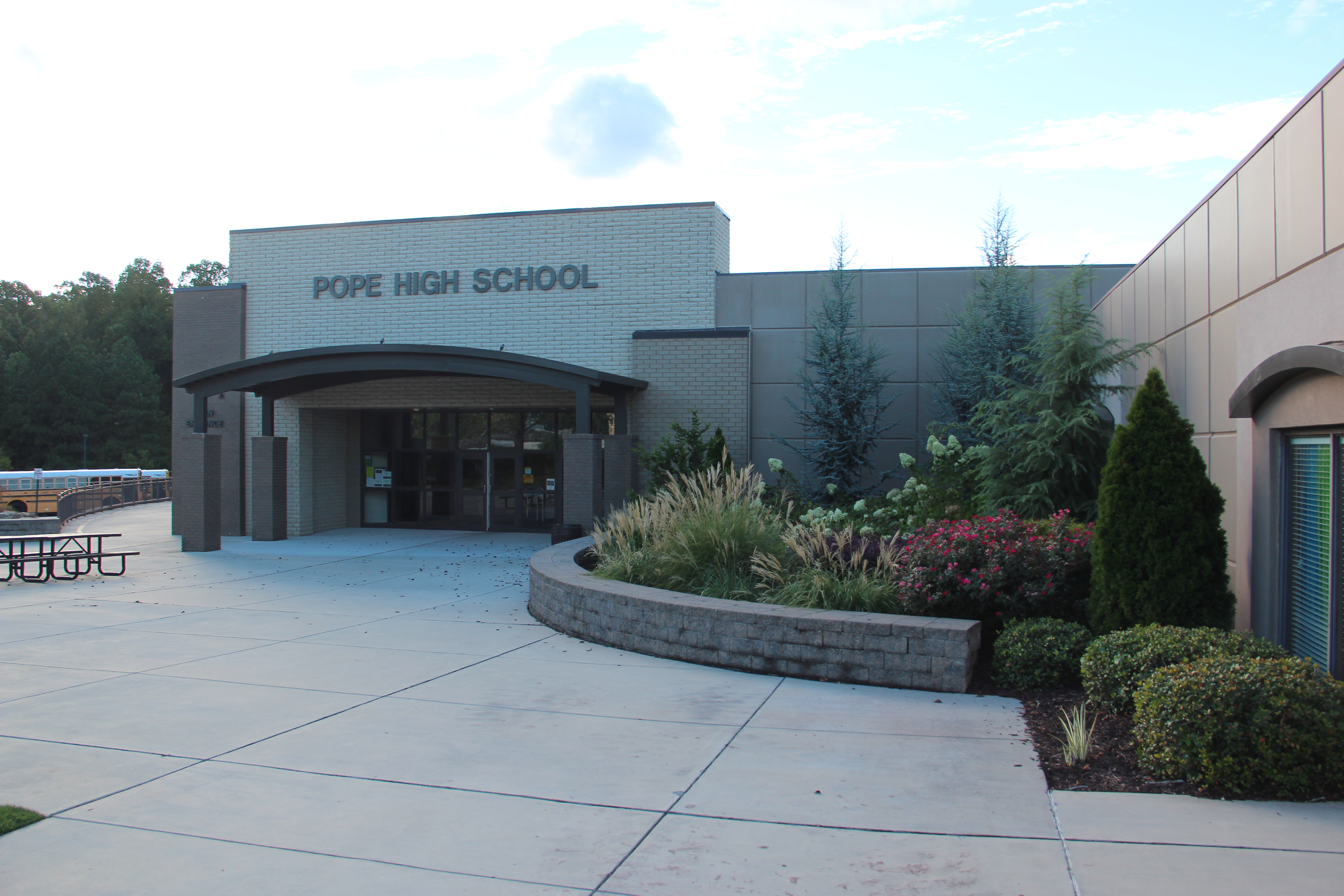

Location
- 3001 Hembree Road; Marietta, Georgia 30062; United States; 34°01′26″N 84°27′09″W

Information
- Type: Public high school
- Established: 1987; 39 years ago
- Principal: Matthew Bradford
- Teaching staff: 103.10 (on an FTE basis)
- Grades: 9–12
- Enrollment: 1,793 (2024–2025)
- Student to teacher ratio: 17.39
- Campus: Suburban
- Colors: Carolina blue, navy, and white
- Mascot: Greyhound
- Newspaper: The Greyhound Tracks
- Yearbook: Panache
- Website: www.cobbk12.org/pope/

Alan C. Pope High School is a public high school located north of Atlanta, Georgia, within unincorporated Cobb County, and with a Marietta postal address. The school was founded in 1987 and serves approximately 1,888 students in grades 9–12. The school mascot is the greyhound, and the school colors are Carolina blue, navy blue, and gray.

== Extracurricular activities ==
=== Athletics ===
Pope's athletic teams are known as the Greyhounds (Lady Greyhounds for female teams). Their athletic rivals include Walton and Lassiter high schools.

Pope is home of the eight-time girl's slow-pitch softball State Champions in 1999, 2000, 2001, 2002, 2003, 2005, 2006, and 2007; four-time AAAAA girls soccer State Champions in 1999, 2000, 2001, and 2002 seasons; AAAA girls track and field State Champions in 1995; and four-time AAAA girls cross country State Champions in 1994, 1995, 1996 and 1997. The Greyhounds also won the 2011 GHSA AAAA Traditional Wrestling Championship, the 2012 GHSA AAAA Dual and Traditional Wrestling Championships, the 2013 GHSA Dual and Traditional Wrestling AAAAA Championships, the 2014 AAAAA Dual Wrestling Championship, and the 2020 AAAAAA Dual Wrestling Championship.

Beginning with the fall 2012 academic year, Pope was reclassified as a AAAAAA (6A) school.

In 2009 Pope High School won the AAAAA Volleyball State Championship. The volleyball team went on to win the next two state titles in 2010 and 2011 in the AAAA classification. Pope won the Georgia AAAA girls' basketball Championship in 1999.

The Greyhounds became the 1999 state AAAA boys cross country champions, the 2018 state AAAAAA cross country champions, 1999 boys' state swimming champions, and the 2009 and 2013 state AAAAA baseball champions. The Pope baseball team also won the 2017, 2018, & 2022 AAAAAA State Championships. In 2009 Pope's volleyball team won the state AAAAA championship, and in 2010 the volleyball team won the AAAA Championship. The Pope volleyball team also won the 2018 AAAAAA state championship.

Pope offers the following sports:

- Baseball
- Basketball
- Cheerleading, spirit and competition
- Cross country
- Fast-pitch softball
- Football
- Golf
- Gymnastics
- Lacrosse
- Rugby
- Slow-pitch and fast-pitch softball
- Soccer
- Swimming and diving
- Tennis
- Track and field
- Volleyball
- Wrestling

== Feeder schools ==
All or some students from the following schools eventually find their way to Pope High School due to local district boundaries.

- Dodgen Middle School
- Hightower Trail Middle School
- Mountain View Elementary School
- Murdock Elementary School
- Shallowford Falls Elementary School
- Timber Ridge Elementary School
- Tritt Elementary School

== Notable alumni ==
- Kelly Barnhill (2015), National Pro Fastpitch (NPF) professional fast-pitch softball pitcher
- Brandon Boggs (2001), Major League Baseball (MLB) left fielder
- Jackson Conway, Major League Soccer (MLS) striker for Atlanta United
- Robert Lane Greene, journalist at The Economist and author
- Shane Harris, journalist at The Atlantic and author
- Yassir Lester, comedian
- Josh Lowe (2016), Major League Baseball (MLB) outfielder
- Nathaniel Lowe (2013), MLB first baseman
- Hampton Morris (2022), USA Weightlifting, 2024 Olympic Bronze Medalist
- James Tibbs III (2021), outfielder for the San Francisco Giants
- Duane Underwood Jr. (2012), MLB pitcher
- Stevie Wilkerson (2010), MLB outfielder
- T. J. Yates (2006), National Football League (NFL) quarterback
