= Wendi Schneider =

American artist and photographer

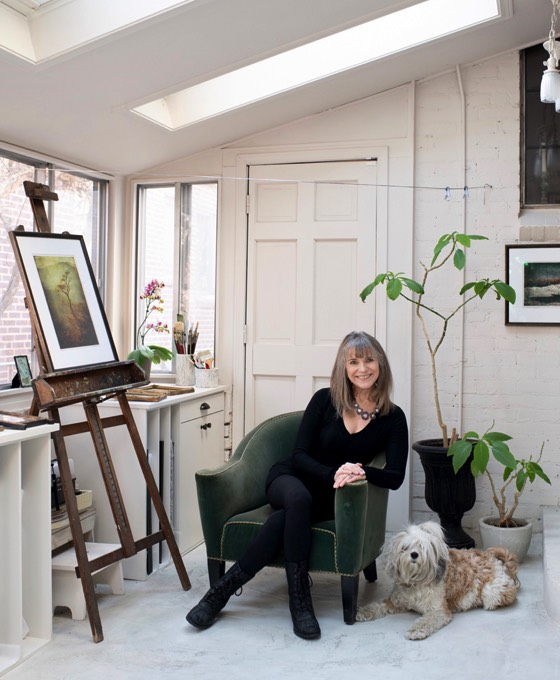
- Born: 1955 (age 70–71); Memphis, Tennessee, U.S.
- Education: Associates of Arts, Stephens College; BA, Newcomb College
- Known for: Photography
- Notable work: States of Grace, Evenings with the Moon

Wendi Schneider (born 1955) is an American artist and photographer based in Denver, Colorado, known for her photographs of nature and wildlife that are often printed on paper vellum or kozo with hand-applied layers of gold leaf on verso. Gilded vellum and kozo photographs from her ongoing "States of Grace" series have been exhibited in more than 100 gallery and museum exhibitions nationally and abroad. Paula Tognarelli, executive director of the Griffin Museum of Photography, has stated: "There is an elegance that emanates from Wendi Schneider's photographs. It can be seen in the turn of a flamingo's neck, in hanging fog or the flick of a betta fish tail. Schneider's photographic gestures are not rare sightings but daily gifts from the natural world for those with the patience to see them."

== Life and early career ==
Born in Memphis, TN in 1955, Schneider attended Stephens College in Columbia, Missouri where she studied Art History, before moving on to Newcomb College in 1975 to study Studio Art. Painting was her chosen medium at this time, and her first use of a camera was to make reference photographs of painting subjects. When she shifted her artistic focus to photography, she sought to integrate her painting background by layering paints and glazes on her photographic prints to "create a more personal impression." After college, she remained in New Orleans and worked for The Times-Picayune, where she photographed, designed, and produced the award-winning 1987 edition of The Picayune's Creole Cook Book. The following year, Schneider moved to New York City, where she photographed for Victoria Magazine while continuing her fine art photography work During this time, her work often appeared on book covers for authors such as Louisa May Alcott, Anne Rice, Tami Hoag, Iris Johansen, Jodi Thomas and more. In 1991, she exhibited a collection of hand-painted photographs titled Mille Fleur at A Gallery for Fine Photography in New Orleans, which continues to represent her work. In 1994, she left New York for Denver, where she still lives today, and later put her fine art practice on hold while she raised her son and worked in commissioned photography, art direction, and design.

== Fine art photography ==
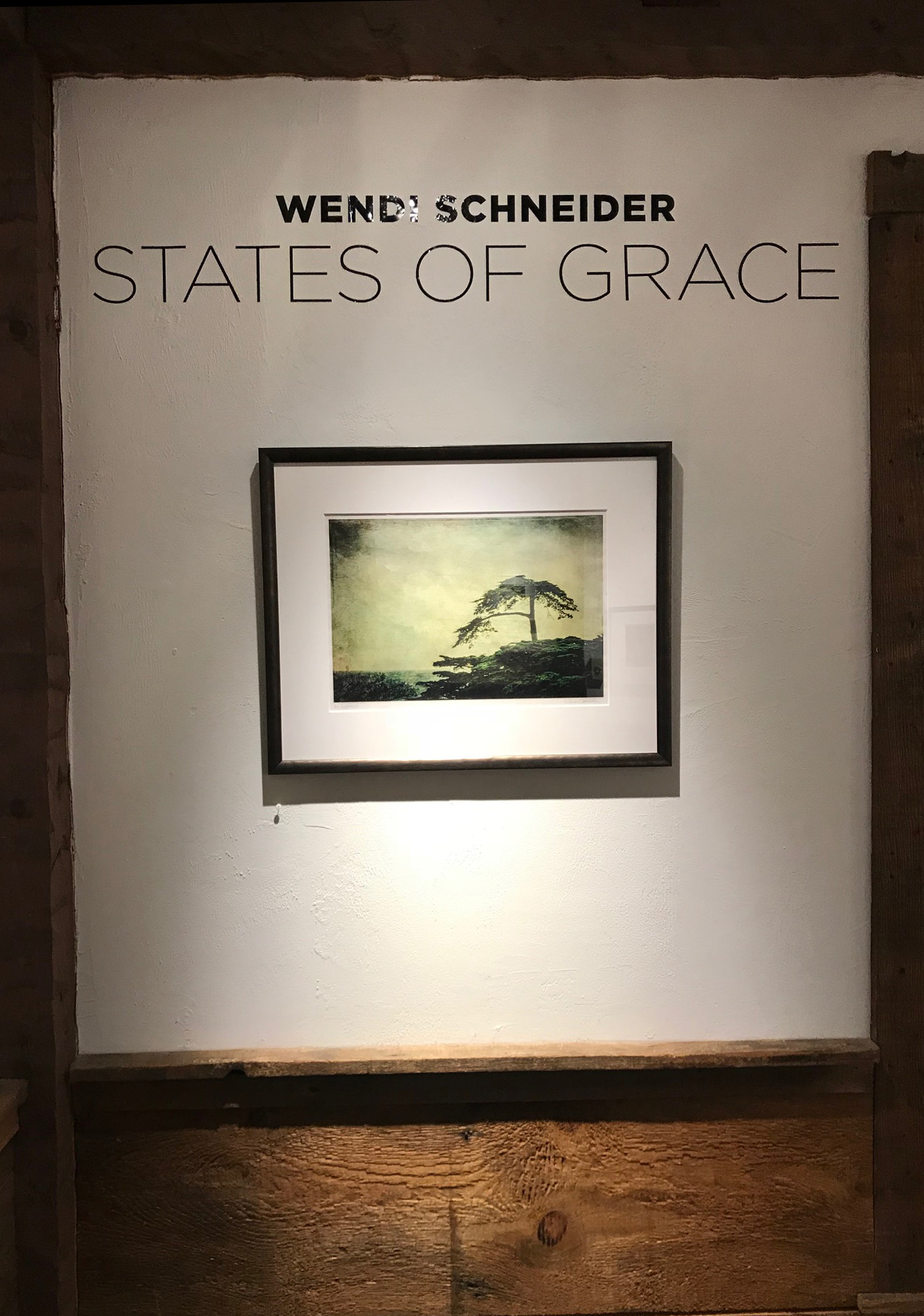
Installation view of States of Grace, Griffin Museum of Photography, 2018

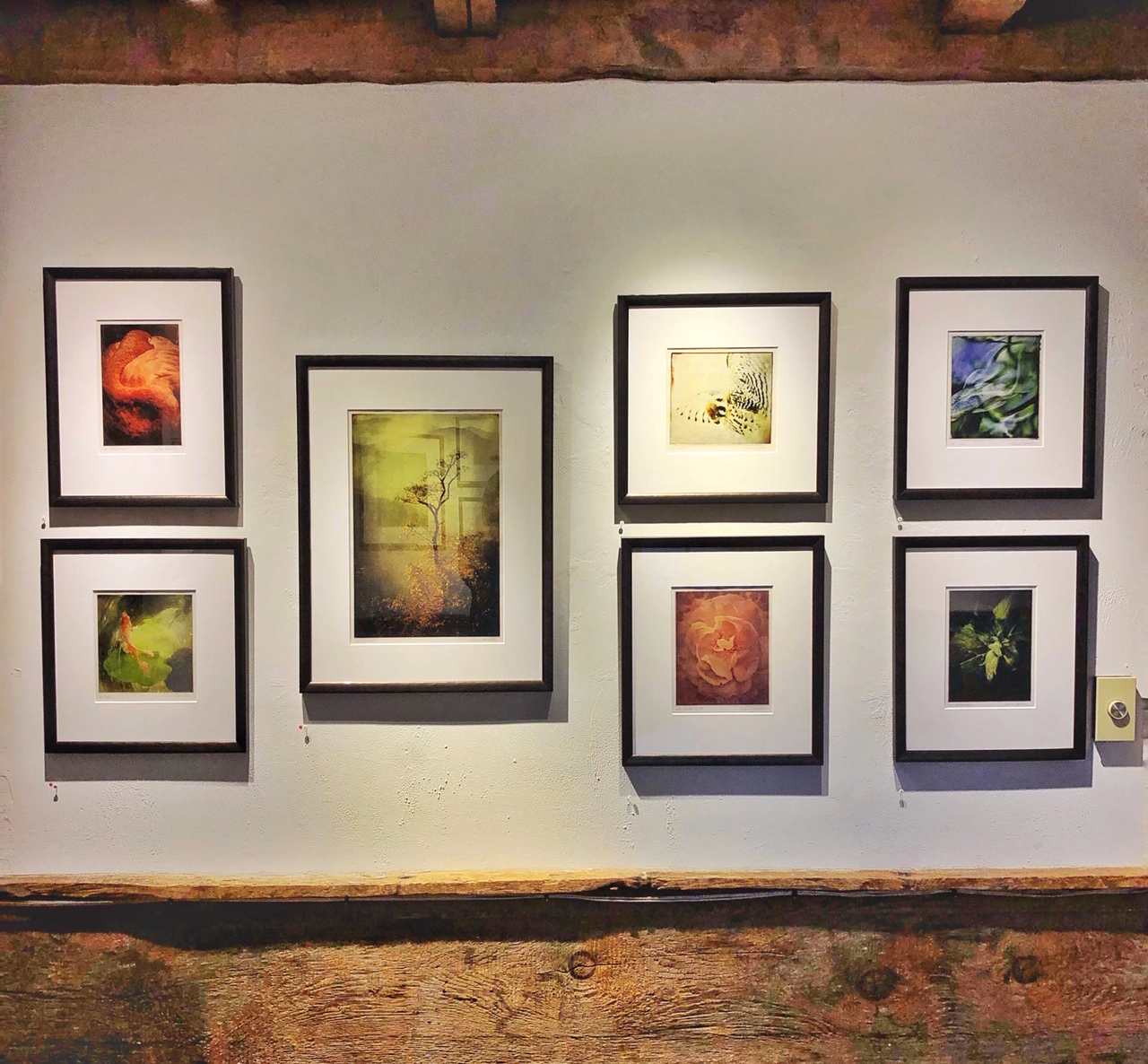
Installation view of States of Grace Griffin Museum of Photography, 2018

In 2010, Schneider was inspired to return her fine art roots; a return visit to A Gallery for Fine Photography in New Orleans cemented the desire to revive her fine art photography practice. Soon after, she began work on her ongoing States of Grace series, and its three attendant sub-series – Flora, Fauna, and Figura – which illustrate Schneider's "affinity for wildlife and the natural world". Schneider is known for the gilding effect she uses in this series, wherein "images are captured, layered and printed digitally with archival pigment ink on paper vellum or kozo, and white gold, 24k gold or silver leaf is then hand-applied to the back of the print, creating a silken sheen on the print's surface." States of Grace has traveled worldwide.

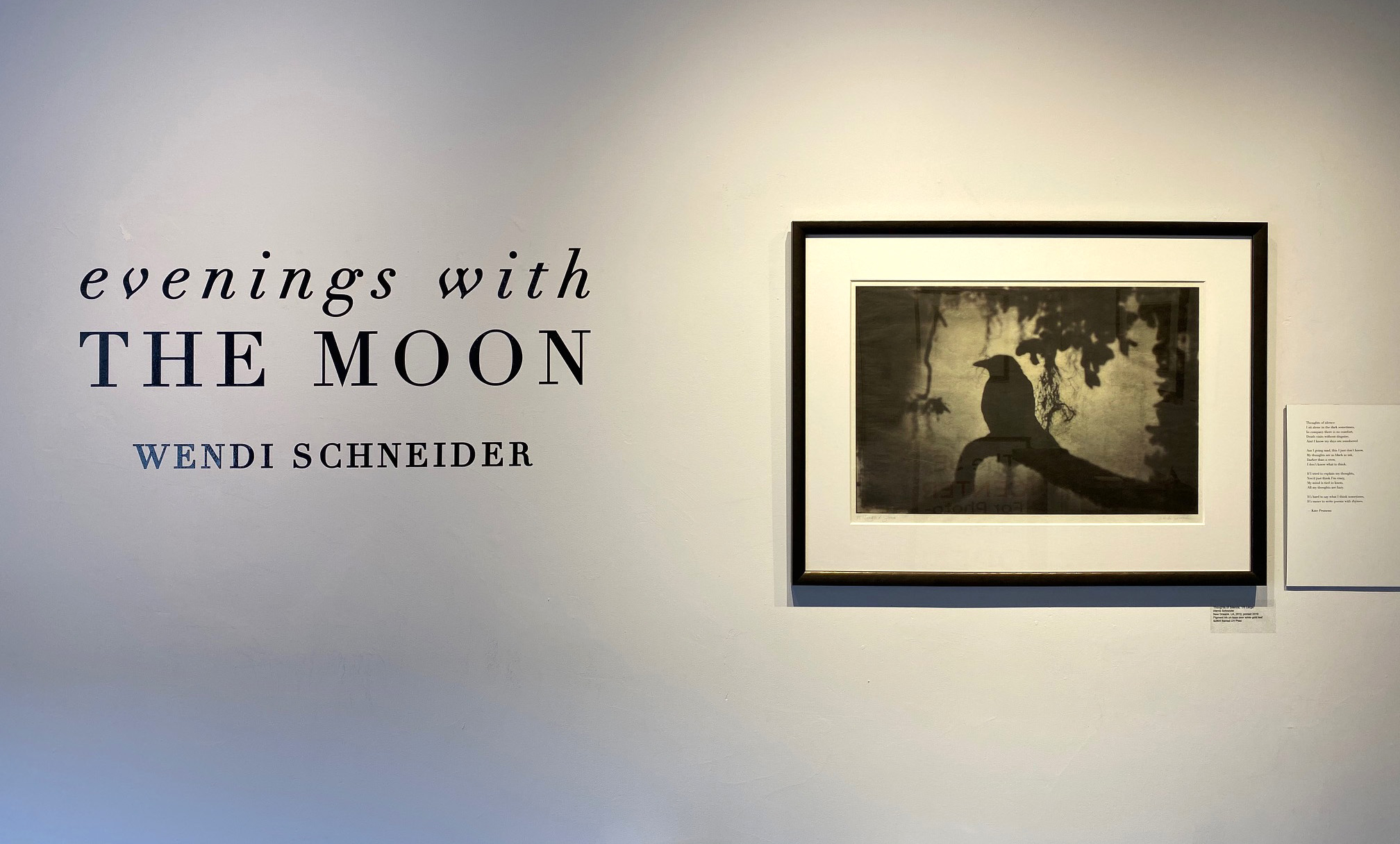
Installation view of Evenings with the Moon, Southeast Center for Photography, 2019

Schneider's most recent series, Evenings with the Moon "engages the moon as muse." Images in this series are printed on paper vellum or Japanese kozo paper and gilded with gold leaf. As of January 2020 Evenings with the Moon has been shown at the Southeast Center for Photography in Greenville, SC; and The Gallery at Mr. Pool in Boulder, CO.

Schneider has been selected as a Finalist for Photolucida's international juried exhibition Critical Mass in 2017, 2018, and 2020. She has taught workshops at the Southeast Center for Photography and A Smith Gallery.

== Awards ==
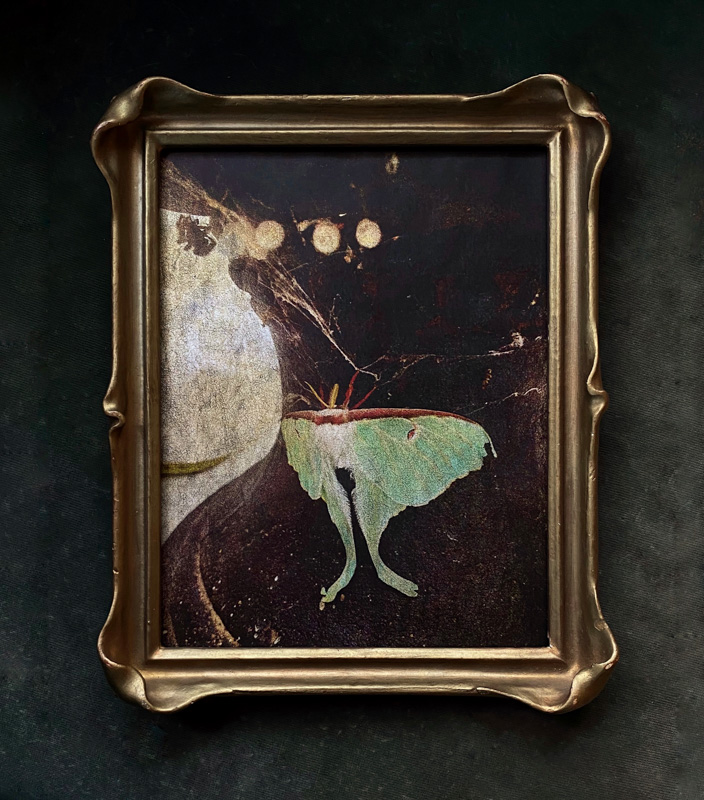
Memento Mori from the Patina Collection of gilded prints and antique frames, 2015 pigment ink on vellum over white gold leaf

- 2014: Black & White Magazine, Best Single Image, Animals
- 2016: International Color Awards, 2nd Place, Merit of Excellence Wildlife
- 2016: San Diego Natural History Museum Best of Nature, First place
- 2016: 9th Annual Julia Margaret Cameron Awards, Single Image, Nude/Figure
- 2017: Neutral Density Photography Awards, Honorable Mention
- 2017: Florida Museum of Photographic Arts, International Exhibit, Third place, Nature, Science, and Animals
- 2017: Animalia, Director's Selection, The Center for Fine Art Photography
- 2017: Gala Awards, First place, Urban & Rural Landscape
- 2018: National Association of Women Artists, Silver, Small Works, Works on Paper
- 2018: American Photography 34
- 2018: Moscow International Photo Awards, Bronze, Nature
- 2018: Prix de la Photographie, Paris (Px3), Bronze, Fine Art, Landscape
- 2019: San Francisco Bay Month of Photography, Gold
- 2020: Px3, Nature/Trees, Gold
