= Frank Relle =

American photographer (born 1976)

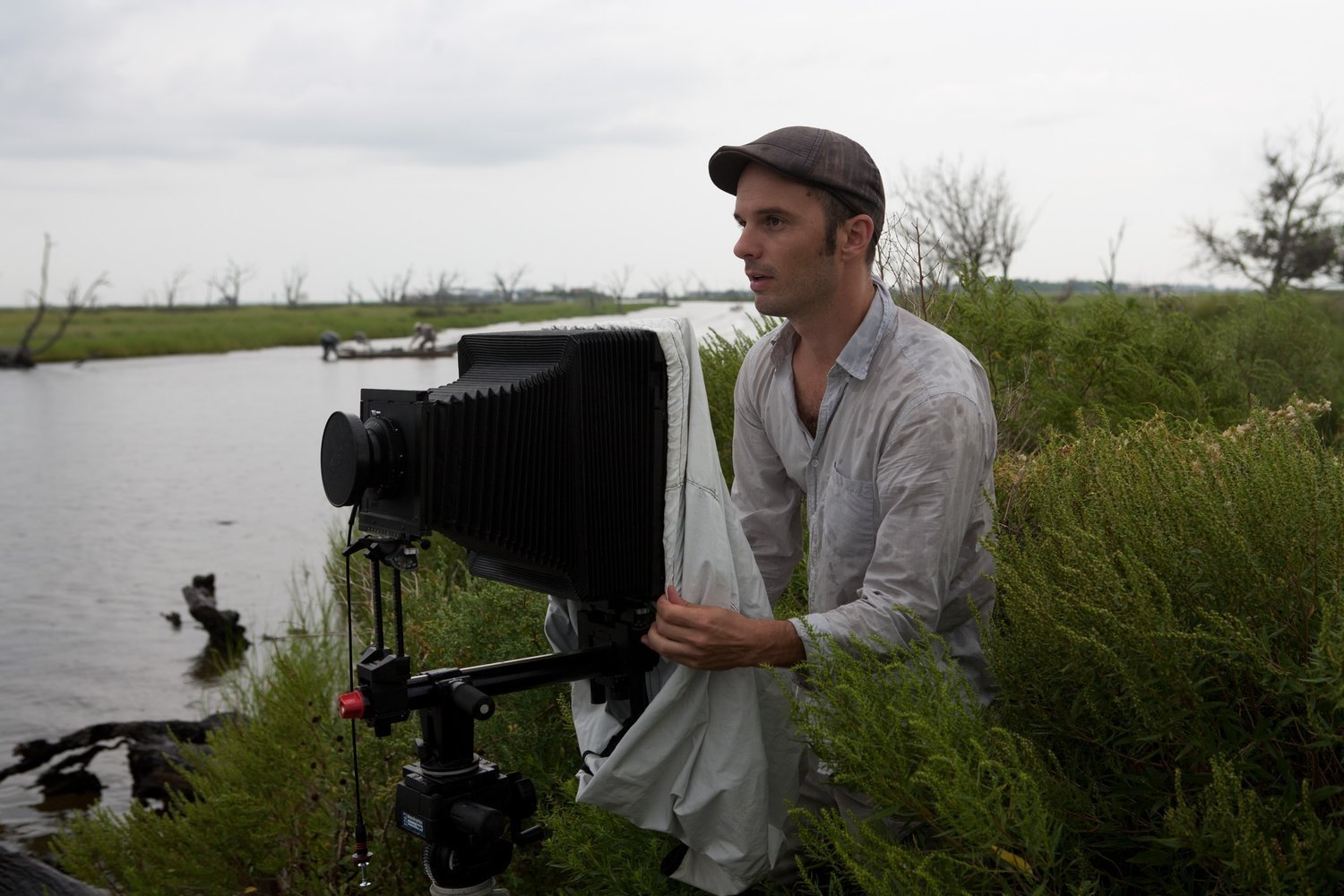
- Born: 1976 (age 49–50)
- Education: Tulane University
- Occupation: Photographer

Frank Relle (born 1976) is an American photographer who lives and works in New Orleans, Louisiana.

Best known for his long-exposure photographs of New Orleans architecture at night, Relle received national and international attention in early 2005 with "New Orleans Nightscapes." The series depicted, among its architectural subjects, homes in New Orleans’ 9th Ward in varying states of decay and dilapidation following Hurricane Katrina. Using a combination of high-pressure sodium, mercury vapor, and daylight-balanced hot lights to illuminate his subjects, Relle bathes his images in haunting color and light that invite the viewer to slow down and to see the familiar as uncanny.

Relle's work is featured in the New Orleans Museum of Art, the Museum of Fine Arts, Houston, and in the permanent collection at the Smithsonian National Museum of American History. His photographs have been printed in The New Yorker, The Southern Review, and Oxford American, as well as many other regional, national, and international publications. He is also the recipient of numerous awards, including the 2007 International Photography Award and the 2019 Michael P. Smith Award for Documentary Photography. Relle was also included in Photolucida's Critical Mass Top 50 Photographers lists in 2007 and 2010.

== Career ==
After graduating from Tulane University with degrees in cognitive science and philosophy, Relle accompanied Gannt Boswell on a research trip to Canada to study and photograph carnivorous plants. He then went to New York City to study photography, where he worked as an assistant to renowned photographers Mary Ellen Mark and Arnold Newman. While working on movie sets and in photography studios, Relle gained a new understanding of lighting. However, he has said that he felt "lost in the bright lights and dark rooms of New York"; in 2004, he moved back to his hometown of New Orleans.

=== Nightscapes (2004–2008) ===
Relle's return to New Orleans coincided with Hurricane Katrina, a Category 5 storm that left the city abandoned and displaced over 1 million people across the Gulf Coast. He documented the devastation in the years that followed, particularly focusing on what became of the structures that were left behind. He often risked run-ins with National Guard patrols in abandoned neighborhoods to get his long-exposure shots of the flooded houses.

David Gonzalez of The New York Times wrote that the images that comprise “Nightscapes” "glow with a moody mix of colors, each one hinting at the dramas and routines played out inside."

Relle developed the project accidentally in 2004, after showing a friend how to take long-exposure night photographs. He liked the resulting images and continued to shoot at night. As his technical proficiency grew, and he began to use a lighting truck, he got permission from homeowners to shoot and received help from local police to shut down streets.

He has said that it was from being driven around in his grandmother's Lincoln Town Car that he identified his unique perspective. "I discovered a new way to see. Low to the ground, that wide, old windshield provided the best viewfinder I've ever used. Shot from 2004 to the present, the photographs are lit to capture the mood from that same perspective. The images leave room for the viewers’ interpretations and for a cast of characters to take position in the foreground."

In Relle's May 2014 New York Times profile, he said: "There are no people in my photos, but they are all character sketches of the people I grew up with. I want to make things that encapsulate that and are able to communicate that not in explicit terms, but giving people access and letting them create their own narratives."

Arts lobbyist and educator Elizabeth Gordon praised Relle's efforts to document the impact of Hurricane Katrina: "Someone had to record it in a way that would grasp its enormity and inconsolable loss. Frank Relle has done that."

“Nightscapes" has been exhibited across the United States. One of its photographs was used as the cover image of the New York Times Best Seller Nine Lives by Dan Baum, and it was accepted into the permanent collection of the Smithsonian National Museum of American History.

=== One Life One Life (2007) ===
Relle has said that while shooting "Nightscapes," he met a man on the street who convinced him that it wasn't safe to roam the streets of New Orleans alone. At the time, it was the third most murderous city in America. Relle took the man's advice and hired an off-duty police officer to accompany him on his nightly shoots. He then became interested in the stories behind New Orleans' murder statistics and found that his ride-along officer could provide detailed accounts of the shooters and victims.

The photo series “One Life One Life" documents the empty lots, sidewalks, and front yards where unsolved murders in New Orleans had taken place. Photographed at night, each piece is titled with the victim's name, date of birth, and date they had been killed. Each photograph is a limited edition print. All proceeds from "One Life One Life" were donated to Efforts of Grace, a non-profit organization fostering community development and education.

=== Inside Out Project: Faces of Hope (2012) ===
Relle's close friend and former New Orleans Saints Safety, Steve Gleason, revealed in 2011 that he was battling ALS (Lou Gehrig's disease). Relle raised awareness for Gleason and his organization, Team Gleason, by participating in the Inside Out Project. "Faces of Hope" involved posting large-scale, expressive portraits of community members on outdoor walls throughout New Orleans' Bayou St. John neighborhood. In an interview with Fox 8's Meg Gatto, Relle explained, "So many people in the community want to give something back to him, and so by photographing the people, and then posting them around, it's like the images for Steve are saying, ‘We're putting on our best face for you.'"

=== Night Shade: Exploring Natural Spaces (2013) ===
In "Night Shade: Exploring Natural Spaces," Relle turned his attention to nature. New Orleans journalist Kat Stromquist wrote that he was “creating haunting images of the dissonance between overgrowth and decay in the humid city. Some photographs frame City Park oaks with immaculate landscaping and symmetrical stars. In others, like images of the West Bank's Brechtel Park, vines and epiphytes overrun trees to create a darklit forest out of Tolkien."”

=== Culture Share (2014) ===
As part of an effort to build mutual understanding between the two countries, the U.S. Embassy in Russia sponsored Relle's “New Orleans in Photographs” at the Multi-Media Museum-Moscow House of Photography. Relle curated 100 large-framed images by recognized photographers and another 1,000 smaller images taken from the photo-sharing social media app Instagram. He replicated the formula used for his first New Orleans-themed, mixed professional/social media photography show for the city's Octavia Gallery, Contemporary Antiques, in 2012.

Using the hashtag #LouisianaCulture, amateur photographers on Instagram submitted over 10,000 images for consideration. The show was an attempt to give Russian visitors a glimpse into the lives of everyday people from southeast Louisiana and a more complex view of a region known primarily by stereotypical images. Attendees were “struck by Louisiana's racial mix and tolerance of differences” and the show's “humanitarian, true and open approach.”

=== Until the Water (2015) ===
Began in the aftermath of the 2010 BP oil spill, “Until the Water” is a “nighttime tour of weathered homes set upon glistening waters, trees sprouting up from swamps, a refinery outlined by a constellation of lights or a concrete road shrouded in mist above the water.” Relle sought to explore “how photographers cover events that start out with drama and disaster but segue into a much longer period of recovery.”

Relle used a flatboat rigged with lights, a generator, and material for tripods long enough to hold his camera steady above the water. To get his shots, he would climb out of the boat after dark and slowly sink into the water wearing a waterproof suit, sneakers, and a knife around his neck to defend against attacks from wild animals. “In the beginning, I tried to take pictures from the boat. Because I work at night and use a slow shutter speed, it turned out to be difficult to get the photo exactly as I wanted on a wobbling boat.”

=== Gallery at 910 Royal Street ===
In 2016, Relle opened a gallery in New Orleans’ French Quarter where visitors can view his long-exposure images of the city and swamps. Photographs are displayed in the double parlor of the historic Miltenberger Houses, once home to Alice Heine, Princess of Monaco from 1889 to 1922.

== Accolades ==
- 2006 Photolucida Critical Mass Top 50
- 2007 International Photography Award
- 2010 Photolucida Critical Mass Top 50
- 2019 Michael P. Smith Award for Documentary Photography

== Collections ==
- Smithsonian National Museum of American History
- New Orleans Museum of Art
- Museum of Fine Arts Houston

== Exhibitions ==
- Louisiana Cultural Economy Summit
- Southern Biennial
- Center for Fine Art Photography
