= Jacqueline Bishop (artist) =

American artist

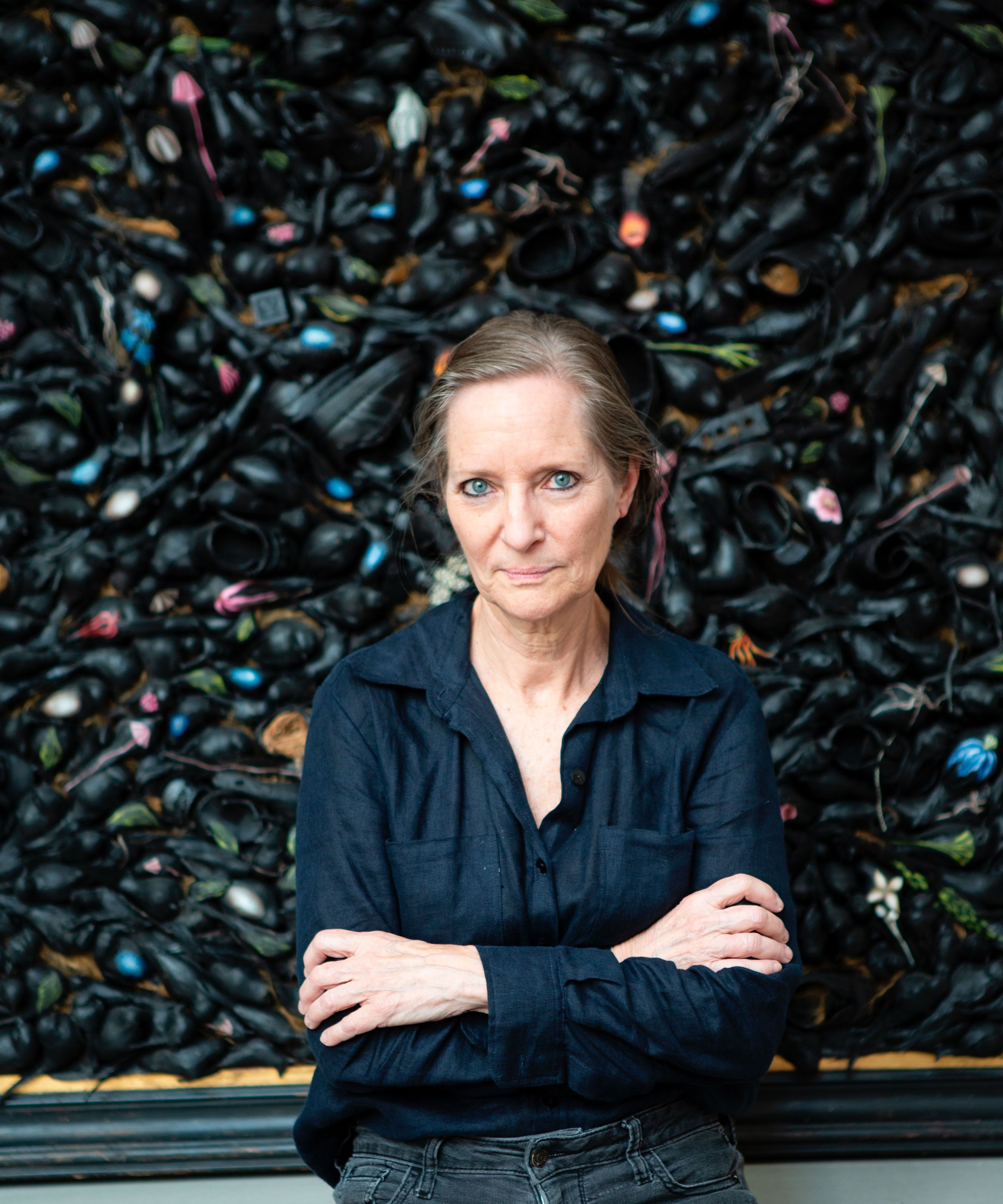
- Born: 1 October 1955 (age 70); Long Beach, California
- Education: University of New Orleans (BA), Tulane University (MA)
- Occupation: Visual Artist
- Writing career
- Genre: Fine Art

Jacqueline K. Bishop is a New Orleans visual artist known for her vibrant and colorful paintings as well as her prints and sculptural boxes, best exemplified in her early Hurricane Series. Bishop was part of artist George Febres's seminal art exhibition space in New Orleans––Galerie Jules LaForgue––and became linked with his group of artists known as the Visionary Imagist.

== Early life ==
Bishop was born in Long Beach, California, in 1955 and grew up in Kansas City, Missouri, and St. Joseph, Missouri, and New Orleans, Louisiana. In 1975 she attended the University of Kansas, Lawrence and received her Bachelors of Art degree from the University of New Orleans in 1978. She received her Masters of Fine Arts from Tulane University in New Orleans in 1982.

== Career ==
As an artist, Bishop was early to focus on environmental issues and climate change, most notably the disappearance of the Rain Forest in Brazil as a parallel to the loss of swamplands surrounding New Orleans. She has continued to create haunting images that explore the damage done to the world and the extinction of many species of animals, especially birds. "Bishop achieves a magic realism, the visual equivalent of Latin American literature," wrote Mary Warner Marien. Bishop is currently represented by the Arthur Roger Gallery in New Orleans.

Her work has appeared in these major collections:

- New Orleans Museum of Art, New Orleans, LA
- Ogden Museum of Southern Art, New Orleans, LA
- Gongju National Museum, Gongju, South Korea
- Contemporary Arts Center, New Orleans LA
- Montgomery Museum of Fine Arts, Montgomery, AL

In addition, Bishop has lectured as a professor of Art and the Environment at both Tulane University and Loyola University in New Orleans. She has exhibited her work extensively, including the following:

- Jacqueline Bishop Paintings | Galerie DeVille, New Orleans - 1980
- Human Threads | Arthur Roger Gallery, New Orleans - 2018
- My Cousin the Saint | Contemporary Arts Center, New Orleans - 1982
- Visionary Imagists | Contemporary Arts Center, New Orleans - 1990
- Natural Wonders: The Art of Jacqueline Bishop and Douglas Bourgeois | Montgomery Museum of Fine Art - 2018
