= Febre =

Febre is a surname. Notable people with the surname include:

- Cristian Febre (born 1980), Chilean football manager and player
- Louis Febre (born 1959), Mexican composer

== See also ==
- Febres, another surname
