= Brechtel Park =

Park in New Orleans, Louisiana, United States

Coordinates: 29.91019°N 90.00755°W

Brechtel Park is a 120 acre urban park in the Algiers neighborhood of New Orleans. The park was founded in 1971 using funds from the Federal Land and Water Conservation Fund, and is maintained by the New Orleans Department of Parks and Parkways. Brechtel is a stop on the Barataria Loop of America’s Wetlands Birding Trail.

The Louisiana Department of Culture, Recreation & Tourism lists the birds living in or seasonally visiting the park as including: great blue, little blue, and green herons; great and snowy egrets; yellow-crowned night herons; white ibis; wood ducks; tree swallows; Mississippi kites; red-shouldered hawks; broad-winged hawks; mourning doves; yellow-billed cuckoos; barred owls; eastern screech owls; red-bellied, downy, hairy, and pileated woodpeckers; great crested flycatchers; white-eyed, yellow-throated, red-eyed, and blue-headed vireos; blue jays; barn swallows; Carolina wrens; Carolina chickadees; tufted titmice; summer tanagers; northern cardinals; sharp-shinned hawks; yellow-bellied sapsuckers; northern flickers; eastern phoebes; golden-crowned and ruby-crowned kinglets; hermit thrush; cedar waxwings; orange-crowned and yellow-rumped warblers; and white-throated sparrows.
