= May Hyman Lesser =

American artist and medical illustrator

- May Hyman Lesser, 1998
- Born: May Hyman; 1927
- Died: July 24, 2001 (aged 73–74); New Orleans, Louisiana, United States
- Education: Tulane University
- Alma mater: University of Alabama
- Known for: Medical illustration
- Awards: Mary Ellen Lopresti Publication Award; 1990; Tiffany Graphics Art Award

May Hyman Lesser (1927 – July 24, 2001) was an American artist and medical illustrator.

== Life and education ==
Her father was a doctor. Growing up, she spent time looking through her father's medical books and this is when her fascination with sketching and etching developed. She graduated from with a Bachelor of Fine Arts from H. Sophie Newcomb College at Tulane University with honors in drawing. She then went on to receive her Master of Fine Arts from the University of Alabama. She did further post graduate work at Columbia University and Johns Hopkins University, where she studied anthropology and child psychiatry, respectively. She also studied printmaking at University of California, Irvine.

In 1967, Lesser asked if she could observe and draw an anatomy class at the University of California, Los Angeles (UCLA). She was intrigued by the shadow and lighting on the cadavers and how the medical students interacted with them. At the end of the anatomy lab after she asked if she could sit in on the final. Dr. Charles Sawyer asked if she would stay with this class until their graduation in 1971. She did, and it is from this time that she published her first book The Art of Learning Medicine in 1974. Lesser continued on with some students from this program, working with them into their internships and residencies at LAC+USC Medical Center. In 1989, Lesser published her second book, An Artist in the University Medical Center after observing residents at the Tulane University Medical Center.

Lesser died on July 24, 2001, at her home in New Orleans, Louisiana.

== Published Work & Awards ==
Lesser had 11 etchings and drawings on covers of the Journal of the American Medical Association. Lesser won the Mary Ellen Lopresti Publication Award of Southeastern Art Librarians Association and Best Art Book of 1990 for "An Artist in the University Medical Center" which was published by Tulane University Press in New Orleans in 1989. She also won the Tiffany Graphics Art Award.

== Exhibitions ==
Lesser's work has been on exhibit at UC Irvine, UCLA, Tulane University, Louisiana State University, the University of Miami, Case Western Reserve University, the Seattle Museum of Art, the Smithsonian Institution, the National Academy of Design, University of Southern California, George Washington University, the Clinical Center of the National Institutes of Health, the National Library of Medicine, the University of Pittsburgh, California State College at Long Beach, and the Detroit Institute of Art.

Her work can be found in the collections of the New Orleans Museum of Art, the National Library of Medicine, the University of North Carolina, the Oklahoma Art Center, the ARS Medical Graphic Art Collection at the Philadelphia Museum of Art, the Grunwald Graphic Art Foundation at UCLA, Weatherspoon Gallery, the Darling BioMedical Library of UCLA, and the Calder Medical Library of the University of Southern California.
