= Tom Sancton =

American writer & clarinetist (born 1949)

- Also known as: Thomas Sancton, Jr. Tom Sancton, Tommy Sancton
- Born: Thomas Alexander Sancton; 1949 (age 76–77); Jackson, Mississippi, U.S.
- Origin: New Orleans, Louisiana, U.S.
- Genre: Traditional New Orleans jazz
- Occupations: Writer/Journalist; Clarinetist; Educator
- Instruments: Clarinet, saxophone
- Website: tom-sancton.com

Thomas Alexander Sancton is an American writer, jazz clarinetist and educator. From 1992 to 2001 he was Paris bureau chief for TIME Magazine, where he worked for 22 years, and he has contributed to numerous publications including Vanity Fair, Fortune, Newsweek and the Wall Street Journal. His acclaimed memoir, Song for My Fathers: a New Orleans Story in Black and White (2006), recounts his early life among traditional jazzmen in his native New Orleans. He taught journalism at the American University of Paris from 2002 to 2004. In 2007 he was named Andrew W. Mellon Professor in the Humanities at Tulane University, where he taught creative writing until 2011. He is currently a research professor at Tulane.

== Biography ==
Sancton grew up in New Orleans and attended local public schools. He began playing the clarinet aged 13, after being taken by his father, Thomas Sancton, Sr., to hear traditional New Orleans jazz at Preservation Hall. He took his first lessons with George Lewis, whose playing he cites as a particular inspiration. Since then he has recorded over a dozen albums, and performed regularly at Preservation Hall and the Palm Court Jazz Cafe with his New Orleans Legacy Band. He has appeared numerous times at the New Orleans Jazz and Heritage Festival and the French Quarter Festival. In January, 2012, he was featured in a Carnegie Hall concert marking the 50th anniversary of the Preservation Hall Jazz Band.

Sancton studied American History and Literature at Harvard, graduating magna cum laude in 1971. He subsequently took a doctorate (D.Phil.) in Modern History at Oxford as a Rhodes scholar. Other honors and distinctions include an Overseas Press Club Award (1987), a citation for "outstanding musical contributions" by the Preservation Resource Center (2012), and a 2014 decoration by the French Culture Ministry as a Knight (Chevalier) in the Order of Arts and Letters.

He is the coauthor of the international bestseller Death of a Princess: The Investigation and author of the political thriller The Armageddon Project. His most recent book, The Last Baron: The Paris Kidnapping that Brought Down an Empire , was published in April 2022.

== Bibliography ==
- Sancton, Tom & Scott MacLeod (1998). Death of a Princess: The Investigation. St Martins Press. ISBN 9780312190378.
- Sancton, Tom & Gilles Delafon (1999). Dear Jacques, Cher Bill: au Coeur de l'Elysée et de la Maison Blanche, 1995-1999. Plon. ISBN 9782259186896.
- Sancton, Tom (2006). Song for My Fathers. Other Press. ISBN 9781590512432.
- — (2007). The Armageddon Project. Other Press. ISBN 9781590512524.
- — (2017). The Bettencourt Affair: the World's Richest Woman and the Scandal that Rocked Paris. Dutton. ISBN 9781101984475.
- — (2021). Sweet Land of Liberty: America in the Mind of the French Left, 1848-1871. Louisiana State University Press. ISBN 978080717430-2.
- — (July–August 2021). "Fighting for the soul of France". Vanity Fair. Vol. 730. pp. 40–43.
- — (2022). The Last Baron: The Paris Kidnapping that Brought Down an Empire. Dutton. ISBN 9780593183809.

== Discography ==
- Tommy Sancton's Black Eagle Jazz Band – 1971 (NBEJB BE-SIX)
- New Orleans Reunion (G.H.B. BCD-283)
- Riviera Reunion (Fleur-de-Lys FDLCD-99)
- Together! Live in Switzerland (FDLCD – 94)
- Louisiana Fairytale: Tommy Sancton's New Orleans Serenaders (G.H.B. BCD-360)
- The Classic Jazz Trio (Rankomatic– RMCD 110)
- City of Million Dreams: The New Orleans Legacy Band (G.H.B. BCD-527)
- Hymns & Spirituals: The Tommy Sancton-Lars Edegran New Orleans Quartet (NOL-CD-99)
