= Elizabeth Fontham =

American epidemiologist

Elizabeth Terrell Hobgood "Terry" Fontham is an American cancer epidemiologist, public health researcher, and founding dean of the Louisiana State University Health Sciences Center New Orleans School of Public Health.

== Education ==
Fontham received her undergraduate degree from Louisiana State University, her MPH in Epidemiology from the Tulane University School of Public Health in 1978, and her doctorate in Public Health Epidemiology in 1983, also from the Tulane University School of Public Health.

== Career ==
Fontham became the associate director of cancer prevention and control at the Stanley S. Scott Cancer Center at Louisiana State University (LSU) in 1996. Also that year, she became a professor of pathology at the LSU Health Sciences Center School of Medicine. From 1998 to 2003, she was chairman of the Louisiana State University Health Sciences Center's Department of Public Health and Preventive Medicine, and remains a professor in this department. She is also the founding dean of the LSU Health Sciences Center School of Public Health. She directed this department's epidemiology program from 2003 to 2004. In 2008, she was named president of the American Cancer Society, becoming the first non-physician to hold this position in the organization's history. Prior to this appointment, she served as a member of the National Cancer Institute's Board of Scientific Counselors.

== Research ==
Fontham is known for her research in cancer epidemiology, such as the link between tobacco, diet, and cancer. For example, she led the first case-control study in the United States that found that passive smoking increased the risk of lung cancer. The tobacco industry responded by trying to gain access to the raw data from the study from University of Southern California researchers in court so as to cast doubt on its results.

== Honors and awards ==
Fontham has received the Alton Ochsner Award Relating Tobacco and Health, the C.L. Brown Award for Leadership Excellence in Tobacco Prevention; the Leadership and Distinguished Service Award of the American College of Epidemiology; and the Pfizer Award for Excellence in Research, Education and Patient Care.
