= Blake Simmons =

American chemical engineer

Blake A. Simmons
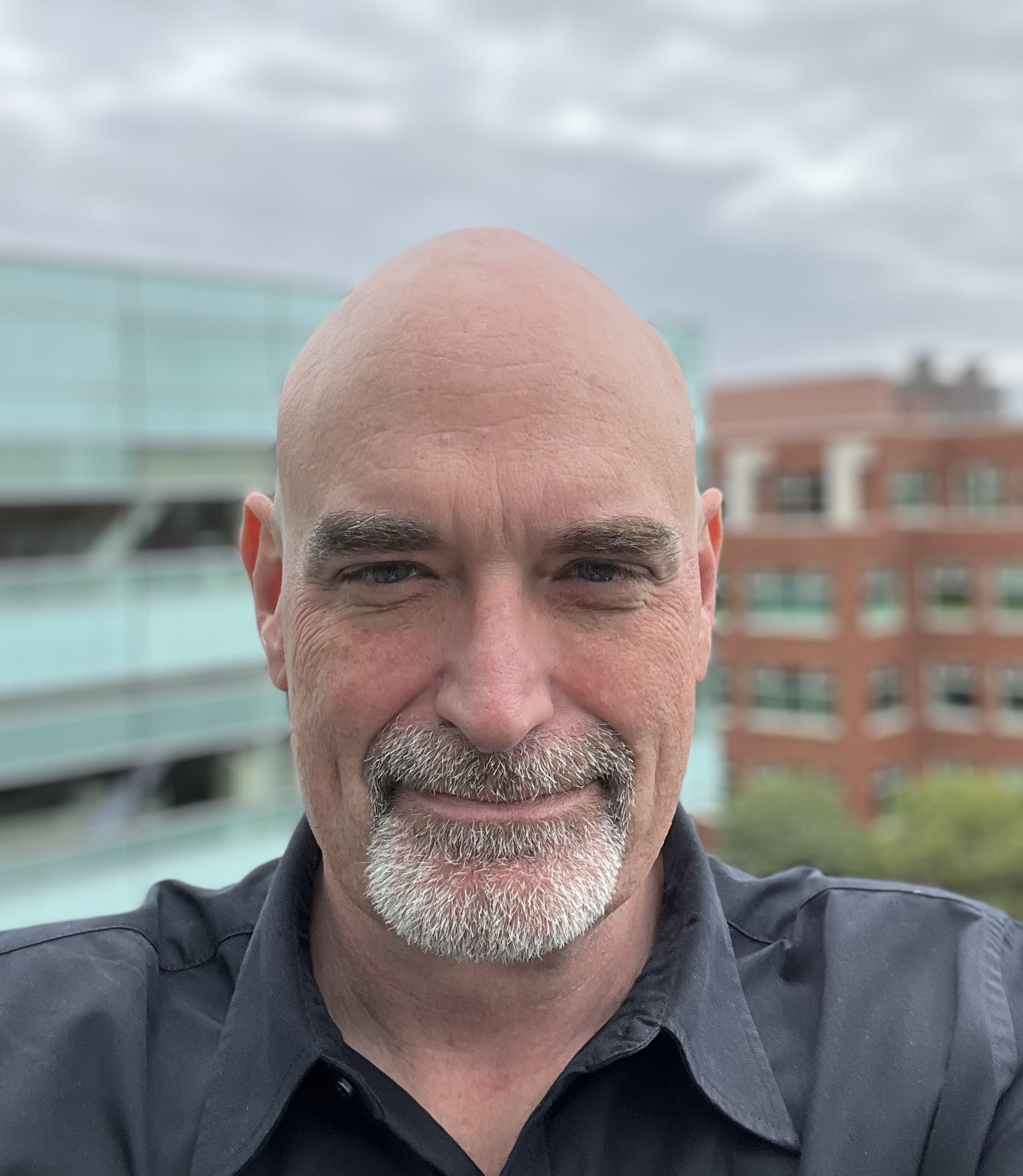
- Born: United States
- Occupations: Chemical engineer, entrepreneur and an academic

Academic background
- Education: B.S., chemical engineering PHD, chemical engineering
- Alma mater: University of Washington; Tulane University

Blake A. Simmons is an American chemical engineer, entrepreneur and an academic. He is an adjunct professor at the University of Queensland, and the University of Hawaiʻi at Hilo, the Director of the Biological Systems and Engineering Division at Lawrence Berkeley National Laboratory, and the Chief Science and Technology Officer at the Joint BioEnergy Institute.

Simmons is most known for his works on biofuels and biomaterials development using biotechnology and biomanufacturing, alongside the development of nanomaterials for energy applications. Among his notable works are his publications in academic journals, including Energy and Environmental Science, ChemSusChem, Nature Microbiology, Green Chemistry, the Proceedings of the National Academy of Sciences, One Earth, and Nature as well as an edited book titled Chemical and Biochemical Catalysis for Next Generation Biofuels.

== Education ==
Simmons completed his Bachelor of Science in chemical engineering from the University of Washington in 1997. In 2001 he obtained a PhD in chemical engineering from Tulane University.

== Career ==
In 2001 Simmons began his tenure at Sandia National Laboratories, where he held various roles including senior member of the technical staff, principal member of the technical staff, manager of the Biomass Science and Conversion Technologies Department and Energy Systems Department. From 2010 to 2014, he served there as senior manager for Biofuels and Biomaterials Science and Technology Group, and the DOE Biomass Program Lead. Subsequently, from 2014 to 2016, he was appointed as the senior manager for Advanced Biomanufacturing Group while retaining his role as Biomass Program Lead. Since 2007, he has held the position of Vice-President of the Deconstruction Division and the Chief Science and Technology Officer at the Joint BioEnergy Institute. In 2016 he joined Lawrence Berkeley National Laboratory, where he is serving as the division director for biological systems and engineering at Lawrence Berkeley National Laboratory. Moreover, he also co-founded Illium Technologies in 2015, Caribou Biofuels in 2020, and Erg Bio in 2023.

Simmons served as a graduate student research assistant at Tulane University from 1997 to 2001. He has been an adjunct professor at the University of Queensland since 2012 and the University of Hawai’i-Hilo since 2023.

== Patents ==
Simmons holds patents on several inventions. This includes a project focused on upgrading biomass, especially by-products of ethanol production, to generate valuable chemical intermediates, fuels, amino acids, and nutrients through pre-treatment and fermentation techniques using modified organisms.

== Research ==
Simmons' research has focused on bioenergy, biotechnology, biomanufacturing, and the development of nanotechnology and nanostructured materials. His early research demonstrated the use of insulator-based dielectrophoresis (iDEP) for effectively separating and concentrating live and dead Escherichia coli cells by exploiting differences in their dielectrophoretic mobility, offering a tool for bacterial analysis without the drawbacks of traditional electrode-based methods. Investigating the preparation, characterization, and optical properties of two zinc metal-organic frameworks (MOFs) based on stilbene linkers, his 2007 collaborative work with Crissie Bauer and others found that their emission spectra correlate with local ligand environments observed in the crystal structures, with implications for sensor applications. In 2009, he collaborated with Seema Singh and others to investigate the use of auto-fluorescent mapping to visualize cellulose and lignin in switchgrass stems during ionic liquid pretreatment. The study revealed disruption of the cell wall, solubilization of biomass, and subsequent cellulose regeneration with high sugar yields, indicating the potential for efficient biofuel production.

Simmons' 2010 work compared the efficiency of two biomass pretreatment technologies, dilute acid hydrolysis and dissolution in an ionic liquid, using switchgrass as a model bioenergy crop, finding that ionic liquid pretreatment enhances saccharification efficiency and glucan yield compared to dilute acid pretreatment. In 2011, he edited the book Chemical and Biochemical Catalysis for Next Generation Biofuels. The book provided a comprehensive overview of catalytic systems and conversion processes involved in the production of lignocellulosic biofuels, comparing biochemical, chemical, and thermochemical approaches to address challenges and advancements in achieving efficient and affordable biofuel production. His 2012 research presented a techno-economic analysis showing that the cost of producing fungal cellulases for lignocellulosic biofuels is higher than commonly assumed, with significant variability depending on factors such as biomass conversion yields and fermentation times. The study also indicated the need for efforts to lower enzyme costs to make biofuel production more economically viable. In 2014, he presented MaxBin, a software algorithm for automatically binning assembled metagenomic sequences, facilitating the recovery of individual genomes from metagenomic datasets. The algorithm accurately identified microbial genomes, as demonstrated through analyses of simulated datasets, real metagenomic data from the Human Microbiome Project, and cellulolytic microbial consortia, allowing for the discovery of novel cellulolytic bacterial populations. In related research, he presented MaxBin 2.0, an improved computational method for recovering microbial genomes from metagenomic datasets.

Through his collaborative work at JBEI, Simmons has worked on the development of a novel class of ionic liquids that are biocompatible with enzymes and microbes. More recently in 2023, he collaboratively developed a mathematical model using COSMO-RS-derived parameters and machine learning techniques to predict the solubility of carbon dioxide in deep eutectic solvents, demonstrating its reliability for CO_{2} capture processes.

== Awards and honors ==
- 1996 — Dow Chemical Outstanding Junior in Chemical Engineering
- 1997 — Recipient, Louisiana Board of Regents Fellowship
- 2009 — Outstanding Young Alumnus Award in Science and Engineering, Tulane University
- 2010 — Lockheed Martin Leadership Award, Sandia National Laboratories
- 2011 — Elected to the College of Fellows, American Institute of Medical and Biological Engineers
- 2018 — DOE Secretary of Energy's Achievement Award, Pretreatment and Process Development Team
- 2020 — DOE Secretary of Energy's Achievement Award, COVID-19 National Virtual Biotechnology Laboratory Team
- 2024 — Elected Fellow, The Royal Society of Chemistry
- 2024 — Elected Fellow, National Academy of Inventors
- 2025 — Elected Fellow, American Association for the Advancement of Science
- 2025 — American Institute of Chemical Engineers Division 15A Plenary Award
- 2026 — Excellence in Bioenergy and Bioeconomy Leadership Award, Energy Evolution Conference
- 2026 — Outstanding Peer Reviewer, Royal Society of Chemistry, Green Chemistry
- 2026 — Berkeley Lab Director's Award, Exceptional Achievement in Tech Transfer

== Bibliography ==
=== Books ===
- Chemical and Biochemical Catalysis for Next Generation Biofuels (2011) ISBN 9781849730303

=== Selected articles ===
- Lapizco-Encinas, B. H., Simmons, B. A., Cummings, E. B., & Fintschenko, Y. (2004). Dielectrophoretic concentration and separation of live and dead bacteria in an array of insulators. Analytical chemistry, 76(6), 1571–1579.
- Bauer, C. A., Timofeeva, T. V., Settersten, T. B., Patterson, B. D., Liu, V. H., Simmons, B. A., & Allendorf, M. D. (2007). Influence of connectivity and porosity on ligand-based luminescence in zinc metal− organic frameworks. Journal of the American Chemical Society, 129(22), 7136–7144.
- Li, C., Knierim, B., Manisseri, C., Arora, R., Scheller, H. V., Auer, M., ... & Singh, S. (2010). Comparison of dilute acid and ionic liquid pretreatment of switchgrass: biomass recalcitrance, delignification and enzymatic saccharification. Bioresource Technology, 101(13), 4900–4906.
- Wu, Y. W., Simmons, B. A., & Singer, S. W. (2016). MaxBin 2.0: an automated binning algorithm to recover genomes from multiple metagenomic datasets. Bioinformatics, 32(4), 605–607.
- Klein-Marcuschamer, D., Oleskowicz-Popiel, P., Simmons, B. A., & Blanch, H. W. (2012). The challenge of enzyme cost in the production of lignocellulosic biofuels. Biotechnology and Bioengineering, 109(4), 1083–1087.
- Xu, F., Sun, J., Konda, N. V. S. N. M., Shi, J., Dutta, T., Scown, C. D., . . . Singh, S. (2016). Transforming biomass conversion with ionic liquids: process intensification and the development of a high-gravity, one-pot process for the production of cellulosic ethanol. Energy and Environmental Science, 9(3), 1042–1049.
- Perez-Pimienta J.A., Papa G., Sun J., Stavila V., Sanchez A., Gladden J., Simmons B.A. (2021). One-pot ethanol production under optimized pretreatment conditions using agave bagasse at high solids loading with low-cost biocompatible protic ionic liquid. Green Chemistry, 24, 207–217.
- Lankiewicz T. S., Choudhary H., Gao Y., Amer B., Lillington S.P., Leggieri P.A., Brown J.L., Swift C.L., Lipzen A., Na H., Amirebrahimi M., Theodorou M. K., Baidoo E.E.K., Barry K., Grigoriev I.V., Tomhokin V.I., Gladden J., Singh S., Mortimer J.C., Ralph J., Simmons B.A., Singer S.W., O’Malley M.A. (2023) Lignin deconstruction by anaerobic fungi. Nature Microbiology, 8, 596–610.
- Dou C., Choudhary H., Wang Z., Baral N.W., Mohan M., Aguilar R.A., Huang S., Holiday A., Banatao D.R., Singh S., Scown C.D., Keasling J.D., Simmons B.A., Sun N. (2023) A hybrid chemical-biological approach can upcycle mixed plastic waste with reduced cost and carbon footprint. One Earth, 6, 1576–1590.
- Healey, A.L., Garsmeur, O., Lovell, J.T. et al. (2024) The complex polyploid genome architecture of sugarcane. Nature, 628, 804–810.
