= Kwan Yuk-noan =

Taiwanese politician

Kwan Yuk-noan (Chinese: 關沃暖; born 27 March 1945) is a Taiwanese engineer and politician.

== Education ==
Kwan studied civil engineering at National Cheng Kung University and Tulane University.

== Political career ==
Kwan joined the Kuomintang in 1972 and was involved in several organizations for overseas Chinese. He represented overseas Chinese on behalf of the party while serving as a member of the Legislative Yuan from 1999 to 2005. In 2002, he criticized the Overseas Chinese Affairs Commission for keeping a list of anonymous members, which was eventually publicized. After five cadets at the Republic of China Military Academy were expelled for cheating in May 2003, Kwan organized a press conference on their behalf. Shortly thereafter, Jason Hu chastised the group of people who aided and defended the expelled cadets. Later that year, Special Report announced plans to publish a VCD parodying Kwan, as part of a series of political parodies.

In 2009, Kwan expressed opposition to a proposal that the Overseas Compatriots Affairs Commission merge with the Ministry of Foreign Affairs. In August 2010, Kwan was indicted on charges of corruption, and suspected of embezzling payments set aside for legislative aides.
