= Héctor Febres =

Héctor Febres (died 10 December 2007) was an Argentine coastguard officer who died while awaiting sentencing after being tried for torture.

== Biography ==
Febres was accused of having tortured dissidents during Argentina's Dirty War period. Thousands of dissidents were tortured at the Navy School of Mechanics, known as ESMA, for seven years beginning in 1976. Febrés was accused of torturing prisoners at the ESMA, and the prosecution had asked for life imprisonment. Febres was found dead in his cell from apparent cyanide poisoning days before he was to be sentenced. His wife and adult children, and two guards, were arrested in connection with his death; they had dined with him the previous evening. It was reported that "Febres had stories to tell and many suspected he might talk", and police were investigating whether he was murdered or killed himself; prosecution lawyers were convinced he was silenced by people linked to the military. Febres would have been the first person from the ESMA to be sentenced.

== Trial and death ==
Febres was scheduled to speak at the oral trial on December 14, 2007, but he was found dead in his cell in Tigre (Buenos Aires province), having been poisoned with cyanide. He left no letters, and the prefects accused of participating in his alleged murder were benefited by the "doubt" of the San Martín Court; however, the judge did not abandon the hypothesis that he may have been silenced to prevent him from implicating other repressors and providing information. Because of his death, the proceedings ended without a sentence.
