= Joshua Mann Pailet =

American photographer

Joshua Mann Pailet is a dealer and collector of fine-art photography, a documentary photographer, and the proprietor of A Gallery for Fine Photography in New Orleans, Louisiana. As a photographer, Pailet documents once-in-a-lifetime events such as the 1976 American Freedom Train, the 1984 World's Fair and the aftermath and devastation of Hurricane Katrina in New Orleans. He opened A Gallery for Fine Photography in 1973, making it one of the first art galleries to be devoted solely to fine-art photography.

== Early life ==
Joshua Mann Pailet was born June 30, 1950, in New Orleans, the son of Charlotte Mann Pailet and Gustave Pailet. His mother was born in 1924 in Brno, Czechoslovakia to a Jewish family, and was the only member of his immediate family to survive the Holocaust after she was rescued along with 668 other children as part of the Kindertransport effort organized by Sir Nicholas Winton. Pailet's parents met in London at the end of World War II – his mother was working as a nurse and his father was a United States Army Lieutenant – and moved to America to Gustave's birthplace, New Orleans, in 1945. The family then moved to Baton Rouge, Louisiana, where Pailet lived before attending Rice University, graduating with Bachelor's degrees in Accounting and Economics in 1973. At Rice University Pailet was first exposed to photography under the tutelage of Eve Sonneman, and was mentored by world-renowned art collectors John and Dominique de Menil of the Menil Collection. After his graduation, Pailet then returned to his birthplace of New Orleans and opened A Gallery for Fine Photography that same year.

== A Gallery for Fine Photography ==
A Gallery held its first exhibition in 1975 featuring the work of master landscape photographer Ansel Adams, whose influence Pailet says "shaped me ... and I began collecting photography in the early 1970s." Four years later, Pailet and A Gallery became founding members of AIPAD, the Association of International Photography Art Dealers. The gallery went on to represent world-renowned photographers such as Henri Cartier-Bresson, Helmut Newton, Sandy Skoglund, Joel-Peter Witkin, Herman Leonard, Sebastiao Salgado, Elliott Erwitt, Ruth Bernhard, Peter Beard, Danny Lyon, Jessica Lange, and many more. Pailet and A Gallery have been staunch supporters of the New Orleans photography community – especially in the aftermath of Hurricane Katrina, when they were instrumental to the founding of the New Orleans Photo Alliance and PhotoNOLA, New Orleans' annual festival of photography – and currently represent many New Orleans–based photographers such as Josephine Sacabo, Louviere+Vanessa, Ben Depp, and Richard Sexton.

== Documentary photography ==
In addition to his career as a gallerist, Pailet has established himself as a well-known documentary photographer with work in the collections of the Smithsonian Institution, the Library of Congress, the Polk Museum of Art and the Menil Collection. After shooting "a roll of film per day for nearly forty years," Pailet has amassed an archive of more than "150,000 black-and-white negatives and 250,000 Kodachrome slides" featuring subjects such as "People, places, things, and once in a lifetime events; steam engine, performers, music, festivals, jazz funerals, the 1984 World's Fair, streets, and characters of New York City, New Orleans, San Francisco, London, Paris, and Prague."

In 1976, Pailet was invited to photograph the American Freedom Train as it made its cross-country journey; Pailet's trip produced 15,000 images, a selection of which was published in the book All Aboard, America." Pailet's next major body of work focused on the 1984 World's Fair in New Orleans, the last world's fair to be held in the United States. Pailet's series "focused on the rebuilding of downtown New Orleans from 1980 to 1985, and the transformation of a riverfront warehouse site into the 1984 Louisiana World Exposition" and was reproduced in the 1987 book The World's Fair, New Orleans.

In August 2005, when Hurricane Katrina made landfall in New Orleans, Pailet remained at his gallery, which fortunately survived undamaged. He remained in New Orleans for the storm's aftermath and rebuilding efforts, and captured what he saw in photographs that would be later be exhibited together on the storm's 10th anniversary as Joshua Mann Pailet: Recover, Rebuild, Rebirth. In 2010, Pailet's work was exhibited in a retrospective at the Polk Museum of Art in Lakeland, Florida, titled Eye See America: Through the Lens of Joshua Mann Pailet. Together with museum curator Adam Justice and board member Robert Puterbaugh, Pailet "combed through thousands of images, ... most of which had never been printed for display ... [and] whittled the images from several thousand to 1,500 and finally to 66." The exhibition ran at the museum from October 2010 through January 2011.
