= Tristram Randolph Kidder =

American geologist and archaeologist

Tristram Randolph Kidder (born 1960) is an American archaeologist and professor of anthropology and environmental studies at Washington University in St. Louis. His research focuses on geoarcheology, climate change, and the evolution of human societies. He has studied cultures in different parts of the world, such as the Southeastern United States as well as China. Kidder is considered an authority on human settlements in the Mississippi River Valley and has researched how they were affected by prehistoric global climate change. Kidder's grandfather, Alfred Kidder, was an archeologist who researched the southwestern U.S. and Mesoamerica during the first half of the 20th century and his uncle, Alfred Kidder, 2d, was also an archeologist. Alfred Kidder, 2d's work focused on Andean archeology, pre-Columbian art and for almost 20 years, he moderated a CBS program called What in the World?

== Early life and education ==
Kidder was born in Kobe, Japan in 1960 and lived there until he was 3 years old; his family then moved to the United States. Kidder received his B.A. in anthropology from Tulane University in 1982 before earning his Ph.D. from Harvard University. While at Harvard, Kidder studied under Stephen Williams.

Kidder returned to Tulane in 1989 as an assistant professor of anthropology and director of the Center for Archaeology. In 2002, Kidder served as Dean of Tulane College. Kidder currently teaches at Washington University in St. Louis where he also serves as Chair of the Department. In 2010, he was elected to head the Southeastern Archaeological Conference, currently serving as its president-elect.

== Archaeological career ==
A significant part of Kidder's recent research has focused on using geoarchaeological and geomorphic analyses to understand the dynamics of human settlement in the Mississippi River Valley. He is currently studying the hypothesis that global climate change ca. 1200-400 B.C. affected populations throughout eastern North America. Research in the Mississippi Valley has provided evidence for sudden and catastrophic flooding. Evidence for this flooding comes from extensive geological and soil mapping, archaeological and stratigraphic investigations, and an extensive system of coring.

Kidder is also interested in the nature of social evolution in Native American societies. His goal is to understand the circumstances that led to periods of greater or lesser social and political complexity. The emergence and decline of mound building among Middle and Late Archaic cultures in eastern North America is an example of the waxing and waning of seemingly complex behavior. Kidder has worked at several Middle to Late Archaic mound sites in the Lower Mississippi Valley, including the well-known Poverty Point site in northeast Louisiana.

Kidder is currently conducting research at the Chinese site of Sanyangzhuang, a farming village buried by a Yellow River flood 2,000 years ago.
