= E. Wesley Ely =

American physician and professor

Eugene Wesley Ely
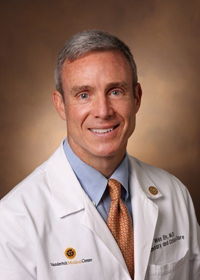

Academic background
- Education: Tulane University; Tulane University School of Public Health and Tropical Medicine; Tulane University School of Medicine

Eugene Wesley Ely is an American physician specialized in critical care and pulmonary medicine. He is a professor of medicine at the school of medicine of Vanderbilt University in Nashville, Tennessee.

According to Scopus, his h-index in late 2022 was 110.

== Bibliography ==
- "Every Deep-Drawn Breath". Simon & Schuster.
