= Paul Wehrle =

Paul Francis Wehrle (18 December 1921–11 May 2004) was a researcher and physician who helped develop of methods to prevent and treat polio and smallpox.

== Education ==
Wehrle graduated from the University of Arizona and received his M.D. degree from Tulane University in 1947. He then became acting chairman of the Microbiology Department of the State University of New York Upstate Medical University at Syracuse, New York.

== Career ==
As a pediatrician he took part in trials of the Salk polio vaccine in the 1950s.

From 1961 to 1988 he was chairman of the Department of Pediatrics at the University of Southern California Medical School.

From 1969 to 1970 he was part of the World Health Organization's campaign to eradicate smallpox. He performed vaccinations, presented lectures and did research into the disease. He also signed the WHO smallpox proclamation.

Wehrle was an advisor to the Surgeon General on immunizations.
