= Matt Battiata =

American businessman and real estate expert

- Born: Washington, D.C.
- Education: Bachelor of Arts in Philosophy
- Alma mater: Tulane University (BA)
- Occupations: Founder and CEO; The Battiata Real Estate Group
- Known for: Real estate expert
- Website: battiata.com

Matt Battiata is an American businessman and real estate expert from California. He has appeared on regional and national media outlets speaking on the topics of real estate, foreclosures, and short sales. He was also featured in the 2006 book Billion Dollar Agent by Steve Kantor.

== Early life and education ==
Battiata was born in Washington, D.C. and attended Tulane University where he earned a B.A. in philosophy. Prior to real estate, Battiata sailed tall ships, including the Californian which he captained in 1996 when it was used for fundraising tours by the nonprofit organization who owned it.

== Career ==
Battiata founded The Battiata Real Estate Group in 1999 in Del Mar, California. Since 2001, he has been rated as one of the top-selling agents in the United States, selling between 200 and 300 homes on an annual basis. Battiata appears regularly on numerous television and radio outlets speaking on the topic of real estate, foreclosures, and short sales. He has been a guest expert on KPBS-FM, KPBS Television, KUSI-TV and also quoted in the Los Angeles Times, The New York Times, The Wall Street Journal and The Washington Post regarding short sales.

Battiata has twice traveled to Washington, D.C. and met with members of both the United States Senate and U.S. House of Representatives. During his visits, he discussed housing market conditions and lobbied for a plan to help curb the number of foreclosures.
