= Xiaobin Wang =

American molecular epidemiologist

- Born: China

Academic background
- Education: MD, 1983, Beijing University; M.P.H., 1987, Tulane University School of Public Health and Tropical Medicine; ScD., 1991, Johns Hopkins Bloomberg School of Public Health
- Thesis: Differences in intrauterine growth and infant mortality among Chinese, Japanese and White Americans (1991)

Academic work
- Institutions: Johns Hopkins Bloomberg School of Public Health; Boston Medical Center; Lurie Children's Hospital

Xiaobin Wang is an American molecular epidemiologist. She is the Zanvyl Krieger Professor in Children's Health at Children's Memorial Institute and director of the Center on the Early Life Origins of Disease at the Johns Hopkins Bloomberg School of Public Health.

== Early life and education ==
Wang was born in China. She completed her medical degree at Beijing University in 1983 and moved to the United States for her graduate degrees. She enrolled at the Tulane University School of Public Health and Tropical Medicine for her Master's degree in public health and Johns Hopkins Bloomberg School of Public Health for her Doctor of Science degree. Upon completing her doctoral degree in maternal and child health, Wang completed a three-year research fellowship in Environmental Epidemiology at Harvard University.

== Career ==
Upon completing her fellowship, Wang began working at Boston Medical Center as an assistant professor of pediatrics. In 1998, she established the Boston Birth Cohort study of preterm birth and its consequences. The study became one of the largest and longest-prospective birth cohorts of urban, low-income, minority women and their children in the United States. Wang's research showed that preterm babies were more prone to elevated insulin levels at birth that persisted into childhood, suggesting that preterm babies may be at future risk of type 2 diabetes. She also established two other large study cohorts; the Chicago Family-based Cohort and the Chinese Twin Cohort.

In 2003, Wang joined the Children's Memorial Institute for Education and Research as director of the Mary Ann and J. Milburn Smith Child Health Research Program. She eventually returned to her alma mater, the Johns Hopkins Bloomberg School of Public Health, and became the director of the Center on the Childhood Origins of Disease. While serving in this role, Wang was also appointed the Zanvyl Krieger Professor in Children's Health. In this role, she continued to study biomarkers, clinical medicine, epidemiology and disease prevention and was eventually elected to the National Academy of Medicine.

== Personal life ==
Wang is married and speaks fluent Chinese and English.
