= Talia Goldstein =

American entrepreneur

- Born: Irvine, California
- Notable work: Three Day Rule (founder)

Talia Goldstein is an American entrepreneur, founder of the matchmaking company Three Day Rule in 2010.

== Biography ==
Talia Goldstein graduated from the Tulane University School of Liberal Arts in 2002.

Talia Goldstein was a TV producer at E! Entertainment. She left her job to host dating events for singles. The parties attending her events grew, so in 2013 she founded the tech-enabled matchmaking company Three Day Rule. The name for the company comes from the film Swingers, in which characters waited three days to call a girl after meeting. Three Day Rule is a matchmaking service with offices in Los Angeles, Orange County, San Francisco, Silicon Valley, Chicago, New York City, Boston, Washington, D.C. and Philadelphia. Three Day Rule matchmakers meet with each of their clients and potential matches in person and use facial recognition software to help improve the search. In 2014, Match.com led a $1.25 million investment in Three Day Rule and, in 2016, the company raised $650,000 from the DAN Fund investment group and $550,000 from other individual sources. In 2018, Three Day Rule launched a program with Amazon to provide daily dating advice through Alexa to Amazon Echo owners.

== Personal life ==
Goldstein became pregnant while she was fundraising for the company and felt pressured to hide the information from investors, later publishing on the issue of pregnancy in the workforce in Fortune.
