= Thomas W. Sherry =

American economist and academic

- Born: March 26, 1951 (age 75)
- Occupations: Ecologist and academic

Academic background
- Education: A.B. Biology; A.M. Biology; Ph.D. Ecology
- Alma mater: Dartmouth College; University of California, Los Angeles

Academic work
- Institutions: Tulane University; Dartmouth College
- Main interests: Long-distance migratory birds, foraging and feeding ecology of insectivorous birds, climate change and environmental threats

Thomas W. Sherry is an American ecologist and academic. He serves as a professor emeritus in the Department of Ecology and Evolutionary Biology at Tulane University.

Sherry's research primarily investigates the population and community ecology of migration, focusing on the long-distance migration of New World warblers (Parulidae) wintering in the Caribbean, with this work published in Proceedings of the Royal Society B and Proceedings of the National Academy of Sciences. His studies in Jamaica focus on non-breeding migratory birds, and he has explored their population ecology, foraging and feeding ecology, diets, and competition, particularly among insectivorous birds. Another major research focus is the proliferation and coexistence of resident tropical birds. In addition to his research, he has taught ecology, evolution, conservation biology, climate change, and other environmental issues, and has supervised 16 PhD students. He is a recipient of several awards, including George H. Lowery Award and the Swallow-tailed Kite Award.

Sherry is an Elected Fellow of the American Ornithological Society and he co-chaired the 3rd and 7th quadrennial North American Ornithological Conferences.

== Education and early career ==
Sherry completed his undergraduate studies in Biology at Dartmouth College in 1973. He obtained a Graduate Fellowship at Dartmouth College, pursuing a master's degree in biology. Continuing his education at the University of California, Los Angeles (UCLA), he received a Regents Fellowship and worked as a Teaching Assistant in Ecology, Field Ecology, Field Ornithology, Field Entomology, and Evolution from 1975 to 1981. He earned an NSF National Needs Fellowship in 1979, and completed his Ph.D. in ecology at UCLA in 1982. Following his doctoral studies, he served as an instructor in Tropical Vertebrate Ecology and worked as a Postdoctoral Research Associate from 1981 to 1988 at Dartmouth College.

== Career ==
Sherry joined Tulane University as an assistant professor in 1989, becoming a Full Professor in 1999. He was a Charles Bullard Fellow in Forest Research at Harvard University in 2018 and served as President Elect of the American Ornithological Society from 2018 to 2020.

From 2016 to 2021, he was the New Day Professor III and the Siegel Professor in Social Entrepreneurship, then the Siegel Professor in Social Entrepreneurship, both in Tulane's Phyllis M. Taylor Center for Social Innovation and Design Thinking. In 2022, he joined the Department of Biological Sciences at Dartmouth College as a Visiting Scholar.

== Research ==
Sherry has focused his research on the population and community ecology of migration, specifically studying birds like the Swainson's warbler, the American swallow-tailed kite, and the American redstart; and later in his career on the proliferation and coexistence of resident tropical birds, leading to the publication of over 120 scientific papers and book chapters. His interests also expanded into teaching and activism related to climate change, and to the increasing threats to the organisms and ecosystems he has studied throughout his career.

Sherry has studied the impact of food availability on migratory bird populations in winter, as well as how predators indirectly affect breeding populations through food dynamics. His lab employed statistical, experimental, and modeling methods to test hypotheses about populations and landscapes. Through collaborative research, he highlighted shade coffee plantations as excellent winter habitat for many migratory birds, offering abundant food and suitable conditions year-round. He also investigated food resources in shade coffee plantations, coastal and montane Caribbean habitats, dietary similarities among species, potential for intra- and interspecific competition, and birds' consumption of coffee insect pests. His lab explored prey selection and the ecology of migrant and tropical birds, comparing prey types and sizes consumed by redstarts in Jamaica and Louisiana. They analyzed prey consumption relative to availability in wet limestone Jamaican habitats, to understand food selection, dietary specialization, and interspecific competition using ecological and evolutionary approaches.

Sherry completed a 10-year study on the impacts of forest loss and fragmentation on resident tropical birds in the Caribbean lowlands of Costa Rica and nearby countries. While a post-doc at Dartmouth, he co-founded with Richard Holmes, research involving the American Redstart (Setophaga ruticilla) and other Neotropical-Nearctic migratory birds wintering at Font Hill, Jamaica, focusing on their year-round ecology. The research emphasized the importance of habitat quality on the wintering grounds and its impact on birds' health and reproductive success on the breeding grounds.

Sherry's lab examined the impacts of pollution and human development in Louisiana on bird populations, emphasizing the critical role of Louisiana's wetlands habitats. These studies on colonial wading birds like herons, ibises, and egrets included the effects of crawfish aquaculture and heavy metal contamination on their populations. Exploring the unique feeding behaviors of the Cocos Finch, endemic to its eponymous tropical oceanic island, he and Tracey Werner challenged conventional ecological theories with evidence of behaviorally maintained, individual feeding specializations.

Sherry's lab contributed to the whole genome sequencing of American Redstarts, and documentation of important genetic variation across the breeding range.

== Awards and honors ==
- 1999 – Elective Fellow, American Ornithological Society
- 2016 – George H. Lowery Award, Louisiana Ornithological Society
- 2022 – Swallow-tailed Kite Award, New Orleans Audubon Society

== Personal life ==
Sherry's early interest in birds and natural history were stimulated in particular by his parents, Grace Coit Meleny (a neighbor and retired school teacher), and Anne LaBastille. His birdwatching interests accumulated a yard bird list of 167 species at his home in Algiers, Louisiana, where he and his wife, Tracey Werner Sherry, kept multiple bird feeders, attracting a variety of species, particularly hummingbirds. Upon his retirement from Tulane, they moved to VT.

== Selected articles ==
- Rodenhouse, Nicholas L.; Sherry, Thomas W.; Holmes, Richard T. (October 1997). "Site-dependent regulation of population size: a new synthesis". Ecology. 78 (7): 2025–2042. Bibcode:1997Ecol...78.2025R. doi:10.2307/2265942. JSTOR 226942.
- John Faaborg; Richard T Holmes; Angela D Anders; et al. (2010). "Conserving migratory land birds in the new world: do we know enough?". Ecological Applications. 20 (2): 398–418. doi:10.1890/09-0397.1. PMID 20405795. Wikidata Q33560123.
- Sherry, T. W. (2016). Avian food and foraging. In I. J. Lovette & J. W. Fitzpatrick (Eds.), The Cornell Lab of Ornithology Handbook of Bird Biology (3rd ed., pp. 264–310). John Wiley & Sons.
- Thomas W Sherry; Cody M Kent; Natalie V Sánchez; Şekercioğlu, Çağan Hakkı (2020). "Insectivorous birds in the Neotropics: Ecological radiations, specialization, and coexistence in species-rich communities". The Auk. 137 (4). doi:10.1093/auk/ukaa049. Wikidata Q112806657.
- Thomas W. Sherry (2023). "Niche concept scale in space and time: evolutionary perspectives from tropical insectivorous birds". Frontiers in Ecology and Evolution. 11. doi:10.3389/fevo.2023.1197920. Wikidata Q120682363.
