= Thomas Naum James =

American cardiologist (1925–2010)

Thomas Naum James (24 October 1925 - 11 September 2010) was a leading American cardiologist during the last half of the twentieth century. He was chairman of the Department of Medicine at the University of Alabama at Birmingham and then president of the University of Texas Medical Branch at Galveston. He is best known for his research in the anatomy of the coronary arteries and the electrical conduction system of the heart. He served as president of the American Heart Association, the International Society and Federation of Cardiology, and the Tenth World Congress of Cardiology. He retired in 2004, and returned to Birmingham, Alabama, where he died in 2010. His grandson, Thomas Fenner James, continues in his medical footsteps at Dr. James' alma mater, Tulane University.
