= Thomas Sancton Sr. =

American novelist and journalist

Thomas Sancton (January 11, 1915 – April 6, 2012) was an American novelist and journalist.

== Biography ==
Sancton was born in the Panama Canal Zone. His family later returned to New Orleans, Louisiana, where he was raised and where he resided for most of his adult life. His two novels, By Starlight and Count Roller Skates, are set in Louisiana. Sancton graduated from Tulane University in 1935 and became a reporter at The Times-Picayune. He studied at Harvard University as a Nieman Fellow in 1941 and 1942. He wrote extensively on civil rights and the South while serving as the managing editor of The New Republic and, later, as Washington editor of The Nation. In the 1950s he was a reporter and feature writer for The New Orleans Item-Tribune, and taught feature writing at Tulane. He also reported for Life magazine, and for the Associated Press. In the 1960s he represented clients of Walker Saussy Inc., a New Orleans–based public relations firm, before launching his own public relations business. In 2013, his extensive papers and correspondence were donated to the Historic New Orleans Collection.

Sancton's son is Thomas Sancton Jr., a noted jazz clarinetist, author, and former Paris bureau chief for Time magazine. He had two daughters, Bethany Villere and Wendy Aucoin. Sancton's wife, Seta Alexander Sancton (1915–2007), was the author of "The World From Gillespie Place," a popular memoir of growing up in Jackson, Mississippi.

== Writings ==
=== Books ===
- By Starlight
- Count Roller Skates

=== The Nation ===
- "The Case of Alger Hiss" (September 4, 1948)
- "Hiss and Chambers: a Tangled Web" (December 18, 1948)
