= Robert Lane Greene =

American journalist

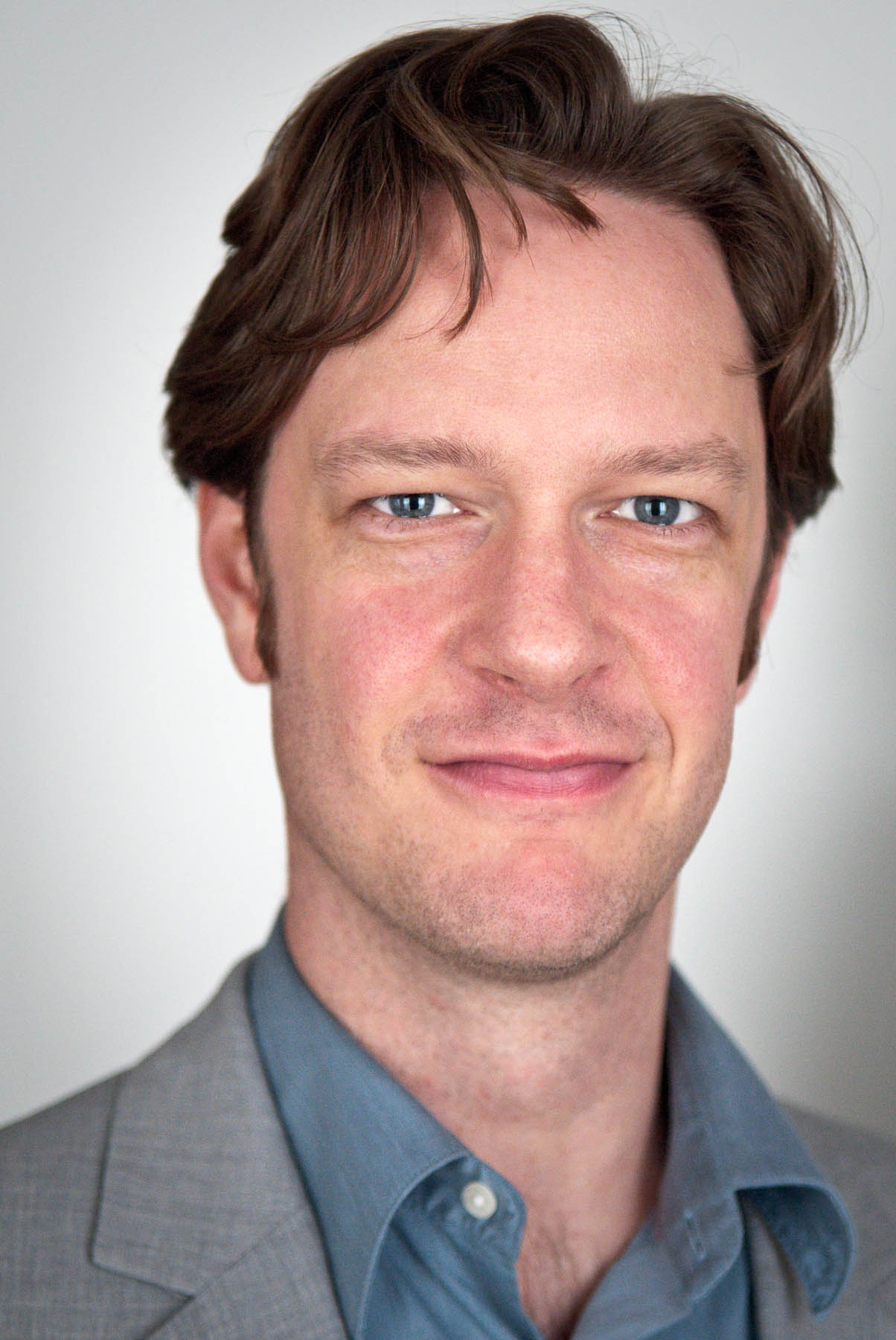
- Born: Johnson City, Tennessee, United States July 23, 1975
- Occupation: Journalist
- Spouse: Eva Høier Greene
- Children: Jack Henry Greene, Henry Høier Greene

Robert Lane Greene is an American journalist, best known for his work for The Economist and his book about the politics of language, You Are What You Speak: Grammar Grouches, Language Laws, and the Politics of Identity, published by Delacorte Press in 2011. Publishers Weekly described the book as "drawing from such sources such as the Tower of Babel, the Balkan Wars and the Ebonics controversy, to explain how the claims people make about 'their' specific language are really about identity politics." He has written a regular column for The New Republic website. He has also written for The New York Times, Slate and a number of other publications. Greene was born in Johnson City, Tennessee, and grew up in Marietta, Georgia. He received a bachelor's degree from Tulane University in 1997 and earned a master's in European Politics in 1999 while attending Oxford University on a Marshall Scholarship.

In 2017, Greene received the Journalism Award of the Linguistic Society of America.

In 2018, he published the book Talk on the Wild Side: Why Language Can't Be Tamed (author: Lane Greene, without 'Robert'; title also: Talk on the Wild Side: Why Language Won't Do As It's Told).
