= George Febres =

George Febres (born Jorge Xavier Febres Cordero Icaza; 10 September 1943, in Guayaquil – New Orleans, 21 May 1996) was an Ecuadorian-born painter, internationally acclaimed for his wildly imaginative style and humorous "visual puns." He is especially known for the banana motif which often appeared in his paintings, a visual juxtaposition of the fruit, very common in Ecuador, and a phallic reference. His work was an important part of the dynamic upswing in New Orleans visual arts in the late 20th century. George was openly homosexual, he was friends with Andy Warhol and other avant-garde artists, possibly the most influential Ecuadorian artist in the United States of the 20th century.

George Febres is credited with starting the art movement called Visionary Imagism in his adopted hometown of New Orleans. His unrestrained and bold imagination and humor won him admirers all over the world. His life in New Orleans was a myriad of roles, from artist to art collector, to curator and gallery owner. This made him a central figure of the artistic renaissance that unfolded in the city in the 1970s. Febres worked with frescoes, mixed media, mosaic, pencil on paper. Although his work showed a strong influence of Surrealism and Pop art, he expanded this ideas into Visionary Imagism.

He is now interred in Saint Louis Cemetery #1.
