= John Bayard =

American politician (1738–1807)

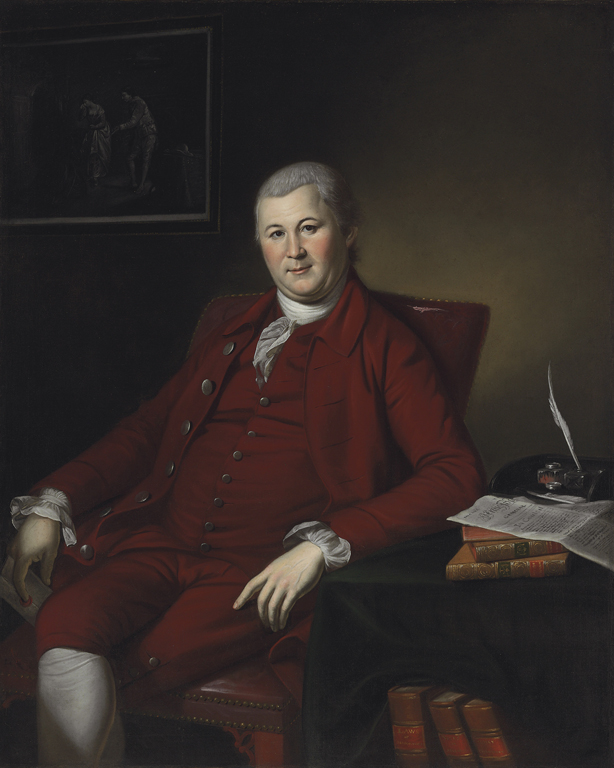
- Oil on canvas portrait by Charles Willson Peale (1781). Housed at the Milwaukee Art Museum.

Mayor of New Brunswick, New Jersey
- In office 1794–1796
- Preceded by: Lewis Dunham
- Succeeded by: Abraham Schuyler
- In office 1790–1793
- Preceded by: Azariah Dunham
- Succeeded by: Lewis Dunham

Member of the Supreme Executive Council of Pennsylvania for the County of Philadelphia
- In office 16 October 1781 – 4 November 1782
- Preceded by: Joseph Reed
- Succeeded by: John Dickinson

Personal details
- Born: John Bubenheim Bayard; 11 August 1738 Bohemia Manor, Province of Maryland, British America
- Died: 7 January 1807 (aged 68) New Brunswick, New Jersey, U.S.
- Spouses: Margaret Hodge (m. 1759; died 1780) Mary Grant Hodgson (m. 1781; died 1785) Johannah White (m. 1786)
- Relations: Littleton Kirkpatrick (grandson); James A. Bayard II (nephew); Charles Hodge (nephew); Andrew Kirkpatrick (son-in-law); Samuel H. Smith (son-in-law); George Dashiell Bayard (great-grandson)
- Children: 8, including Margaret
- Parent(s): James Bayard; Mary Asheton
- Education: West Nottingham Academy

Military service
- Allegiance: United States
- Branch/service: Continental Army
- Rank: Colonel
- Battles/wars: Revolutionary War • Battle of Brandywine • Battle of Germantown • Battle of Trenton

John Bubenheim Bayard (11 August 1738 – 7 January 1807) was a merchant, soldier, and statesman from Philadelphia, Pennsylvania. He achieved the rank of colonel while serving with the Continental Army, and was a delegate for Pennsylvania to the Congress of the Confederation in 1785 and 1786. Later he was elected as mayor of New Brunswick, New Jersey.

== Early life ==
John Bubenheim Bayard was born on 11 August 1738 to James Bayard (1717–1780) and the former Mary Asheton (born c. 1715) at Bohemia Manor, Cecil County, Maryland. He had a twin brother, James Asheton Bayard (1738–1770).

Their father James was the youngest son of Samuel Bayard (1675–1721), who was born in New Amsterdam, and Susanna Bouchelle (1678–1750), both of French Huguenot ancestry. He also had Dutch and English ancestry as well. James Bayard was educated at West Nottingham Academy under the tutelage of the Rev. Samuel Finley, who later became the 5th President of Princeton University.

=== Family ===
Bayard's paternal line were French Huguenots who escaped France through the Netherlands. His 2x great-grandfather, Samuel Bayard (died c. 1653), the son of the Rev. Lazare Bayard, married Anna Stuyvesant, the daughter of the Rev. Balthazar Stuyvesant, in the Netherlands in 1638. After Samuel Bayard's death, she brought their four children, of which Petrus Bayard (d. 1690), John Bayard's great-grandfather, was the eldest, to New Netherland with her, where her brother Peter Stuyvesant was Director-General. In 1698, John Bayard's grandfather, Samuel Bayard (1675–1721), moved to Maryland and established a plantation known as Bohemia Manor in Cecil County. It remained the seat of the family for several generations of the Bayard family.

== Career ==
In 1755, John Bayard moved to Philadelphia and became a merchant. He entered the business world in the counting-room of a merchant, John Rhea. He began making his own investments in shipping voyages, prospered, and became one of the leaders in the merchant community. When he joined his own firm, it was named Hodge & Bayard. In 1765 Bayard signed the non-importation agreement in protest of the Stamp Act, even though it hurt his own business. By 1766, he had become one of the leaders of the Philadelphia Sons of Liberty.

=== Revolutionary War ===
Bayard was elected to the convention of Pennsylvania in July 1774, and re-elected in 1775. This group was originally the revolutionary counter to the official assembly, but eventually replaced it as the legislature for the new government. When regiments were raised for the defense of Philadelphia in 1775, Bayard became Colonel of the second regiment. In 1776, when the convention had become a constitutional assembly, he was named to the Committee of Safety. In March 1777, he became a member of the state's Board of War, and the Speaker of the Pennsylvania Assembly, and was re-elected in 1778.

In the meantime, Hodge & Bayard was contracted with the Continental Congress to supply the Continental Army. Bayard fitted out a ship sent out as a privateer. But, in the fall of 1777, the British occupied Philadelphia. Bayard moved his family to a farm at Plymouth. After getting them settled, he took to the field with his regiment. They fought at the Battles of Brandywine, Germantown, and Princeton. Bayard was cited by General Washington for his gallant leadership in the Battle of Princeton.

In 1781, Bayard became head of the Board of War, and as such joined the state's Executive Council. Under Pennsylvania's 1776 constitution this was a kind of combination of the roles of a governor's cabinet and the state Senate. In 1785 he was elected to the Congress of the Confederation, the successor of the Continental Congress. He served there in 1785 and 1786, attending their meetings in New York, then the temporary seat of government. In 1787, he was elected to the American Philosophical Society.

=== Later life ===
By 1788, Bayard had settled most of the debts he had run up during the war. He was forced to sell the estate in Maryland to another branch of the family, and closed down his Philadelphia business. He built a new home in New Brunswick, New Jersey, and moved there in the expectation of retiring. But in 1790, he was elected mayor of New Brunswick. Then, for many of his remaining years he sat as the judge in the court of common pleas for Middlesex County. He died at home in New Brunswick, New Jersey, on 7 January 1807, and is buried in the First Presbyterian Churchyard there.

== Personal life ==
In 1759, he married Margaret Hodge (1740–1780), the daughter of Andrew Hodge (1711–1789), sister of Andrew Hodge and Hugh Hodge, and the aunt of Rev. Charles Hodge (1797–1878), in Philadelphia. Before her death in 1780, the couple had several children, including:

- James Ashton Bayard (1760–1788), who graduated from Princeton in 1781, and who married to Eliza Rodgers, daughter of Dr. John Rodgers, a trustee of Princeton from 1765 to 1807.
- Andrew Bayard (1762–1833), who graduated from Princeton in 1779, and who married a daughter of Col. Charles Pettit
- John Murray Bayard (1766–1823), who married Margaret Carrick.
- Samuel Bayard (1766–1840), who graduated from Princeton in 1784, and who married Martha Pintard, daughter of Lewis Pintard and Susan Stockton (sister of Richard Stockton)
- Jane Bayard (1772–1851), who married Andrew Kirkpatrick (1756–1831)
- Nicholas Serl Bayard (1774–1821), who in 1798 married Anna Livingston Bayard (d. 1802), the daughter of Nicholas Bayard (1736–1798) and Catherine Livingston (1743–1775). The latter was the daughter of Peter Van Brugh Livingston and his wife. After Anna's death in 1802, he married Esther McIntosh, the daughter of Gen. Lachlan McIntosh and the former Sarah Threadcraft.
- Margaret Bayard (1778–1844), who married Samuel Harrison Smith (1772–1845) in 1800 and became a published writer. She is best known for her posthumously published memoir, The First Forty Years of Washington Society (1906), drawn from her letters to family and friends.
- Anna Bayard (1779–1869), who married Samuel Boyd.

The household was enlarged after the couple adopted the three orphaned children of John's twin brother, James Asheton Bayard I (1738–1770). He had married Margaret Hodge's sister Ann, who also died young. Two young nephews and a niece joined the John Bayard household in 1770: John H. Bayard (1762–1820), Jane Bayard (b. 1765), and James Asheton Bayard II (1767–1815). He graduated from Princeton in 1784.

In 1781, shortly after the death of his first wife Margaret, Bayard remarried, to Mary (née Grant) Hodgson (d. 1785). She was a widow of John Hodgson of South Carolina.

After Mary's death in 1785, Bayard married for the third and final time to Johannah White (d. 1834), sister of General Anthony Walton White (1750–1803), sister-in-law of William Paterson (1745–1806), and granddaughter of Lewis Morris (1671–1746), the Chief Justice of New York from 1715 to 1733 and Governor of New Jersey from 1738 to 1746. She survived him and died on June 26, 1834, in New Brunswick, New Jersey. Neither of the later marriages had surviving children.

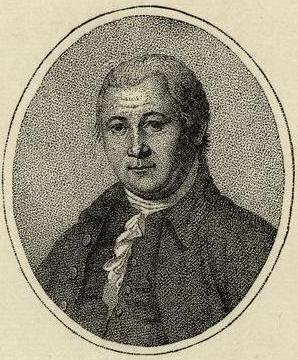

=== Descendants ===
Through his eldest son, James Bayard, he was the grandfather of two, James Asheton Bayard and Anthony Walton Bayard (1737–1860).

Through his second son, Andrew Bayard, he was the grandfather of six, Sarah Bayard, John Bayard (1795–1869) (a founder of the Philomathean Society at the University of Pennsylvania), Elizabeth Bayard, Theodosia Bayard, James Bayard, and Charles Bayard.

Through his third son, John Murray Bayard, he was the grandfather of Jane Bayard (who married A. H. Stevens).

Through his fourth son, Samuel Bayard, he was the grandfather of seven, Rev. Dr. Lewis Pintard Bayard (1791–1840), Susan Bayard, Maria Bayard, Samuel John Bayard (1801–1878) (who married Jane Ann Winder Dashiel, the parents of Gen. George Dashiell Bayard (1835–1862)), William Marsden Bayard (1803–1863), Juliet Elizabeth Bayard (1806–1865) (who married William Augustine Washington II (1804–1830), son of William A. Washington), and Caroline Smith Bayard (1814–1891) (who married Albert Baldwin Dod (1805–1845)).

Through his fifth child, Jane Bayard Kirkpatrick, he was the grandfather of Mary Ann Kirkpatrick, John Bayard Kirkpatrick (1795–1864), George Littleton Kirkpatrick (1797–1859), Jane Eudora Kirkpatrick (who married Rev. Dr. Jonathan Cogswell in 1837, the parents of Jane Emily Searle Cogswell who married James Grant Wilson in 1869), Elizabeth Kirkpatrick, Sarah Kirkpatrick, and Charles Kirkpatrick.

Through his sixth child, Nicholas Serl Bayard, he was the grandfather to Nicholas James Bayard (1799–1879) (who married Sarah Harris, Sarah Glen, and Eliza Hand née King (1808–1883)), Jane Bayard (who married Rev. James Leighton Wilson), and Margaret Esther Bayard (who married Rev. James Read Eckard, the parents of Leighton Wilson Eckard who married Bessie Schofield).

Through his seventh child, Margaret Bayard Smith, he was the grandfather of Julia Smith, Susan Smith, John Bayard Harrison Smith, and Anne Smith.

Through his eight and youngest child, Anna Bayard Boyd, he was the grandfather of Bayard Boyd (1815–1904) (who married Manette Lansing (1817–1904)), Elizabeth Boyd, Anna Boyd, and Isabella Boyd.

== See also ==
- List of mayors of New Brunswick, New Jersey
- Bayard family

Political offices
Preceded by Abraham Schuyler	Mayor of New Brunswick, New Jersey; 1794–1796	Succeeded by Lewis Dunham
Preceded by Joseph Reed	Member of the Supreme Executive Council of Pennsylvania for the County of Philadelphia; 1781 – 1782	Succeeded by John Dickinson
