= Van Liew Cemetery =

Cemetery in North Brunswick, New Jersey, US

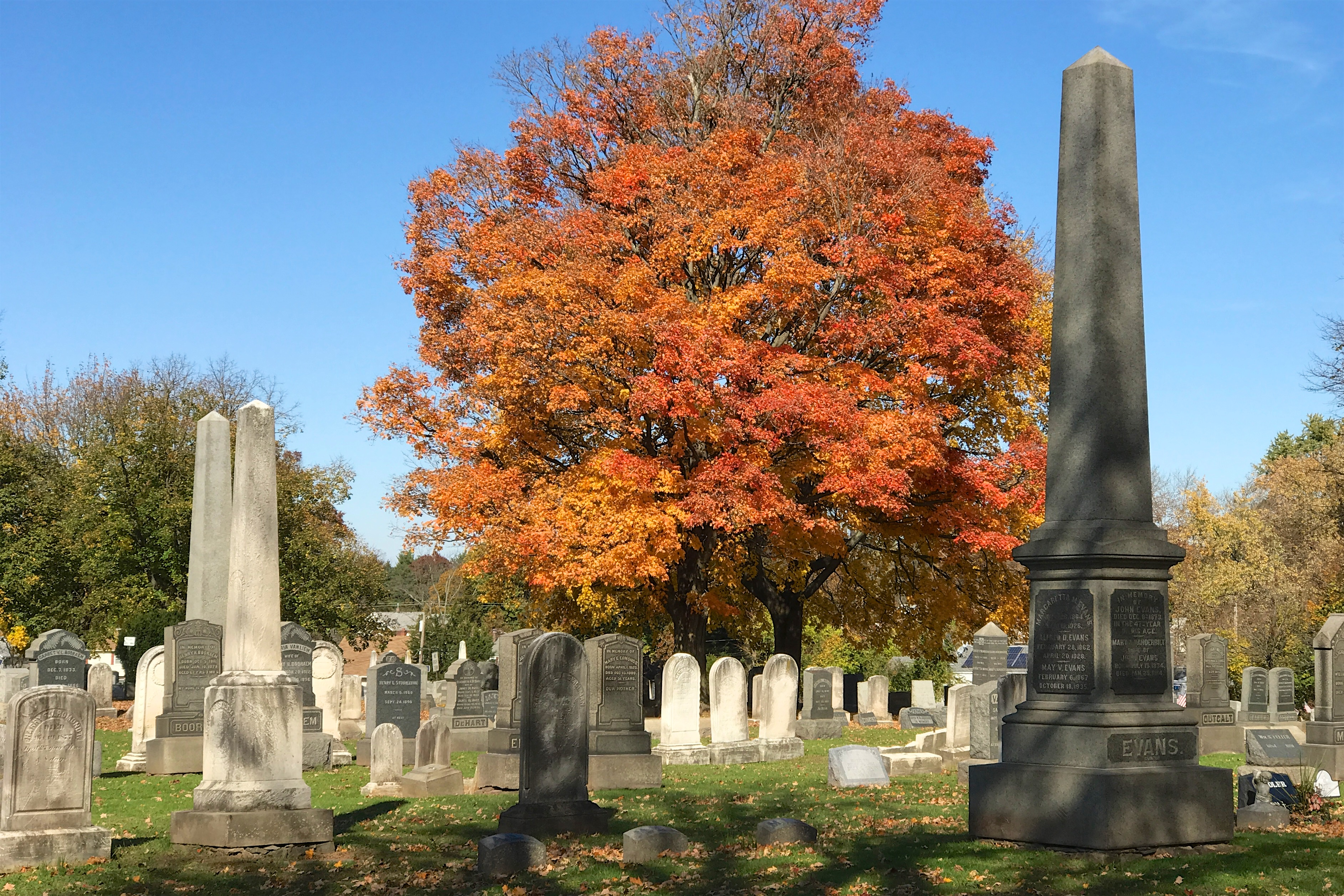
- Interactive map of Van Liew Cemetery

Details
- Location: 585 Georges Road; North Brunswick, New Jersey
- Coordinates: 40°28′13″N 74°27′05″W
- Find a Grave: Van Liew Cemetery

The Van Liew Cemetery is located at 585 Georges Road in North Brunswick, Middlesex County, New Jersey. It also has an entrance from Pine Street. The cemetery is one of the oldest in the township.

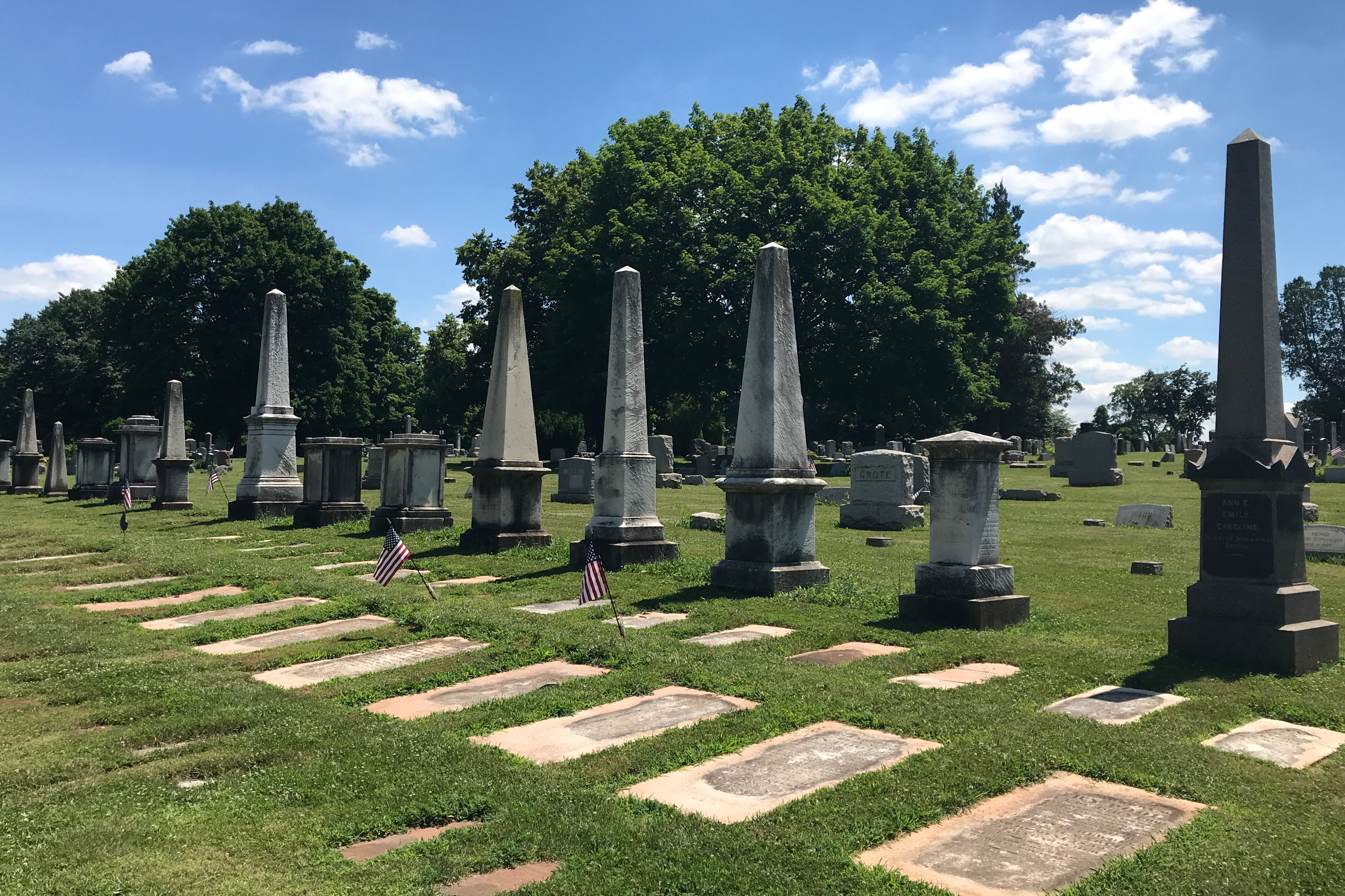
First Presbyterian Church plot area in Van Liew Cemetery

Around 1966, Alfred Yorston removed 520 bodies from the First Presbyterian Church, New Brunswick's cemetery to Van Liew Cemetery to make way for new construction at that church.

== Notable burials ==
- Garnett Bowditch Adrain (1815–1878) US Congressman
- J. Edward Crabiel (d. 1992) of Milltown, New Jersey, a Democrat. Alternate delegate to the 1948 Democratic National Convention from New Jersey; member of New Jersey General Assembly, 1953–65; member of New Jersey Senate, 1966–77; Secretary of State of New Jersey, 1974–77.
- Arthur Gottlieb (1918–1965) Pro football player
- Littleton Kirkpatrick (1797–1859), represented New Jersey's 4th congressional district in the United States House of Representatives from 1853 to 1855, and was mayor of New Brunswick in 1841 and 1842.
- James E. Mills (1878–1965) Husband of Eleanor Mills of Hall-Mills Murder
- Charlotte E. Mills (1906–1952), daughter of James and Eleanor
- John Neilson (1745–1833) of New Jersey. Delegate to Continental Congress from New Jersey, 1778; delegate to New Jersey state constitutional convention, 1790; member of New Jersey state legislature, 1800–01.
- Charles Van Liew Booream of Milltown, New Jersey, a Democrat. Delegate to 1932 Democratic National Convention from New Jersey.
- Eleanor Reinhardt Mills (1888–1922), of Hall-Mills Murder
- William Paterson (1745–1806), Signer of the US Constitution (cenotaph)
- Micah Williams (1782–1837), painter
