= Miles Ross =

American politician and businessman

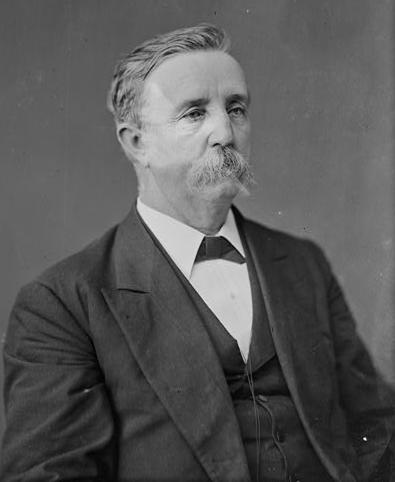

Member of the U.S. House of Representatives from New Jersey's 3rd district
- In office March 4, 1875 – March 3, 1883
- Preceded by: Amos Clark, Jr.
- Succeeded by: John Kean

Member of the New Jersey General Assembly
- In office 1863–1864

Mayor of New Brunswick, New Jersey
- In office 1867–1869
- Preceded by: John T. Jenkins
- Succeeded by: George J. Janeway

Personal details
- Born: April 30, 1827 Raritan Township, U.S.
- Died: February 22, 1903 (aged 75) New Brunswick, U.S.
- Party: Democratic
- Profession: Politician; businessman

Miles Ross (April 30, 1827 – February 22, 1903) was an American Democratic Party politician and businessman who represented New Jersey's 3rd congressional district in the United States House of Representatives for four terms from 1875 to 1883.

== Early life and education ==
Born in Raritan Township, New Jersey, Ross received a practical English education and engaged in the transportation of freight by water and in the coal business with his father.

== Career ==
He served on the Board of Chosen Freeholders from New Brunswick, New Jersey, from 1859 to 1864, was a member of the New Jersey General Assembly in 1863 and 1864 and was a director of several banks. Ross was a member of the board of street commissioners in 1865 and 1866, was Mayor of New Brunswick, New Jersey, from 1867 to 1869.

=== Congress ===
Ross was elected as a Democrat to Congress in 1874, serving from 1875 to 1883, being unsuccessful for reelection in 1882. There, he served as chairman of the Committee on Militia from 1877 to 1881.

== Later career and death ==
After leaving Congress, Ross was a delegate to the Democratic National Conventions in 1884, 1888 and 1892 and engaged in the wholesale and retail coal business.

He died in New Brunswick on February 22, 1903, and was interred in Elmwood Cemetery in North Brunswick, New Jersey.

Political offices
Preceded by John T. Jenkins	Mayor of New Brunswick, New Jersey; 1867 – 1869	Succeeded by George J. Janeway
U.S. House of Representatives
Preceded by Amos Clark, Jr.	Member of the U.S. House of Representatives from New Jersey's 3rd congressional district March 4, 1875 – March 3, 1883	Succeeded by John Kean
