= Mayor of New Brunswick, New Jersey =

Political office in the United States

Mayor of New Brunswick
- Incumbent; James M. Cahill since 1991
- Inaugural holder: Thomas Farmer
- Formation: 1730
- Website: Mayor's Office

The Mayor of New Brunswick is head of the executive branch of the government of New Brunswick, New Jersey. The leaders of New Brunswick have not always been elected. In the early years of the city, its leaders were selected by the British monarchy.

The first four mayors are considered "colonial" in that their power stemmed from royal charters granted by the Kingdom of Great Britain. Beginning in 1784, the leaders of the city served pursuant to a charter granted by the State of New Jersey.

From 1784 to 1801, there was no mayor and New Brunswick's top official was referred to as "President of the Common Council." Subsequently, several mayors were appointed by the State Legislature of New Jersey. Beginning in the early 19th century, mayors were directly elected by voters. Initially, the term was one year and beginning in 1863, it was two years. Partisan mayor elections were held in April until 1901 when they were combined with the November general election.

Beginning in 1915, New Brunswick's form of government changed to the Walsh Act, with no direct elections for mayor. Instead, every four years, the city held a non-partisan election in May, electing five commissioners, who would then select from among themselves who would be given the title of mayor. Though not always the case, the title would often go to the candidate who received the most votes in the preceding election.

Since 1970, New Brunswick has been run under the Faulkner Act's Mayor-Council plan, with partisan mayor elections every four years. Party primary elections are held in June and the general election is held in November. Democrats have swept all but the 1974 elections, when an independent slate of candidates prevailed.

#	Term of office	Mayor	Born and died	Notes and references
Faulkner Act Mayors (1971–present)
62	1991–	James M. Cahill	born 1952	Elected in November 1990, Cahill was re-elected in 1994, 1998, 2002, 2006, 2010, 2014, 2018, and 2022. Cahill ran as a Democrat each time. Cousin of former mayor John A. Lynch Jr. Currently in his ninth term as mayor, he has been in office for 35 years, 265 days and is the longest-serving mayor in New Brunswick's history.
61	1979–1991	John A. Lynch Jr.	born 1938	Elected in November 1978, and re-elected in 1982 and 1986. Lynch ran as a Democrat each time. He is the son of former mayor John A. Lynch, Sr. Like his father, John Lynch, Jr. also represented New Brunswick in the State Senate. Lynch, Jr. did not run for re-election in 1990, the same year that he became senate president.
60	1978	Gilbert L. Nelson	1942–2011	After the resignation of Richard J. Mulligan, Nelson was appointed mayor on September 21, 1978. He finished out Mulligan's term and did not run for a full term.
59	1975–1978	Richard J. Mulligan	born 1942	Elected in November 1974. Mulligan ran as an independent candidate. Resigned during his term and moved to Jackson, Wyoming. Son of former Mayor Richard V. Mulligan.
58	1974	Aldrage B. Cooper II	1937–2016	After the resignation of Patricia Sheehan, Cooper was appointed mayor on February 20, 1974 to finish her term. Cooper was New Brunswick's first African-American mayor. Margaret Bertalan replaced Cooper on the City Council, while Cooper unsuccessfully sought a full term as mayor in the 1974 election.
57	1967–1974	Patricia Q. Sheehan	1934–2025	After voters changed to a new partisan form of government with direct mayor elections, Sheehan ran as a Democrat and won re-election in November 1970. Sheehan resigned from office to become the Commissioner of the NJ Department of Community Affairs in the administration of Governor Brendan Byrne.
Commission Mayors (1915–1970)
57	1967–1974	Patricia Q. Sheehan	1934–2025	Elected to the City Commission in May 1967, Sheehan was selected by her commissioner colleagues to serve as mayor, becoming the city's first female mayor. She was the last mayor under the commission form of government, and the first under the new form.
56	1955–1967	Chester W. Paulus	1905–1994	Paulus was again selected by his fellow commissioners to serve as mayor in 1955. He was re-elected in 1959 and 1963, and continued to serve as mayor. After 27 years in elected office, Paulus lost his 1967 re-election campaign.
55	1951–1954	John A. Lynch, Sr.	1908–1978	Lynch was appointed to the City Commission on December 3, 1946 (replacing Harry W. Dwyer), and was first elected to body in 1947. Lynch was re-elected in 1951, and selected by his commissioner colleagues to serve as mayor. In 1955, Lynch was re-elected to the commission, but resigned to focus on his campaign for State Senate.
54	1943–1951	Chester W. Paulus	1905–1994	First elected to the City Commission in May 1943, Paulus was selected by his commissioner colleagues to serve as mayor. He was re-elected in 1947 and again served as mayor. After being re-elected to the commission in 1951, he was replaced as mayor. Paulus would be re-installed as mayor after Lynch left the commission in 1955.
53	1942–1943	Harry W. Dwyer	???–1965	Dwyer was first elected to the City Commission in May 1939, and in 1942, he was selected by his commissioner colleagues to serve as mayor after the resignation of Richard V. Mulligan. Dwyer won re-election to the commission in 1943, but did not continue as mayor. He resigned from the commission to become City Clerk on December 3, 1946.
52	1939–1942	Richard V. Mulligan	???–1973	Mulligan was appointed to the City Commission June 28, 1938 (replacing Samuel D. Hoffman), and was first elected in May 1939. Mulligan was then selected by his commissioner colleagues to serve as mayor. Mulligan resigned from elected office to take a job with Johnson & Johnson, and Harry W. Dwyer was elevated to the mayor position, while Herbert Dailey was selected to replace Mulligan on the commission March 3, 1942.
51	1935–1939	Frederick F. Richardson	1893–1981	First elected to the City Commission in May 1935, and selected by his commissioner colleagues to serve as mayor. Richardson won re-election to the commission in 1939, but did not continue as mayor. In 1943, he lost his re-election bid.
50	1918–1935	John J. Morrison	???–1952	An elected member of the inaugural City Commission, Morrison was chosen by his colleagues to take on the position of mayor after death of Edward Farrington. Morrison had previously served as Mayor from 1910 to 1914. He was re-elected to the Commission in 1923, 1927, and 1931. In 1935, he lost his re-election bid.
49	1915–1918	Edward Farrington	1886–1918	Elected to the City Commission on April 6, 1915, Farrington was New Brunswick's first mayor under the Commission form of government. Elected at the age of 29, he was the youngest person to occupy the office. He led the city government during World War I, but died in December 1918 in a viral epidemic. Farrington Lake was named in his honor.
Two-Year Term Mayors (1863–1915)
48	1914–1915	Austin Scott	1848–1922	Elected in November 1913, defeating Republican Elmer E. Wyckoff in a close race. Scott, a former Rutgers University President, ran as a Democrat. He was New Brunswick's last mayor under aldermanic form of government, and his term was cut short when voters approved a change to a different form of government in March 1915. He sought election under the new form of government, coming in seventh place in a contest for five Commissioner seats.
47	1910–1913	John J. Morrison	???–1952	Elected in November 1909, and re-elected in 1911. Morrison was a grocer and bank official who ran as a Republican and defeated Democrat Grover T. Applegate both times in close races. Morrison also served as President of the New Jersey State League of Municipalities for two years, and held many roles in city government. He later served as mayor under the commission form of government from 1918-1935.
46	1908–1909	W. Edwin Florance	1865–1943	Elected in November 1907, Florance ran as a Democrat and defeated Republican Theodore Whitlock in a close race. An attorney who worked in banking and insurance, Florance also served as a member of the State Board of Education during his time as mayor, and after his term, he went on to become a "Prosecutor of the Pleas of Middlesex County" from 1914-1915, and then State Senator from 1916-18.
45	1906–1907	Drury W. Cooper	1872–1957	Elected in November 1905. Cooper, an attorney, ran as a Republican and defeated Democrat John Lawrence.
44	1904–1905	William S. Meyers	1866–1945	Elected in November 1903. Meyers ran as a Republican and defeated Democrat Charles Deshler in a close race.
43	1902–1903	George A. Viehmann	1868–1918	Elected in November 1901 after a state law abolished spring municipal elections. Viehmann ran as a Democrat and defeated the incumbent mayor, Republican Nicholas Williamson, in a close race.
42	1895–1901	Nicholas Williamson	1845–1902	Elected in April 1895, and re-elected in 1897 and 1899. Williamson ran as a Republican each time, defeating Democrats named Atkinson (1895) and Hoagland (1897). He ran unopposed for re-election in 1899 and his final term was extended until December 31, 1901 by a state law that moved local elections from April to November. In 1901, Williamson lost his re-election bid.
41	1889–1895	James H. Van Cleef	1841–1917	Elected in April 1889, and re-elected in 1891 and 1893. Van Cleef ran as a Democrat each time, defeating a Republican named Fisher in 1889. He ran unopposed for re-election in 1891 and 1893.
40	1881–1889	William S. Strong	1831–1903	Elected in April 1881, re-elected in 1883, 1885, and 1887. Strong ran as a Democrat each time, defeating Republicans named McIntosh (1881), Resnick (1883), and Morris (1885), and a Progressive candidate named Janeway (1887).
39	1879–1881	DeWitt Ten Broeck Reilly	1837–1900	Elected in April 1879. Reilly ran as a Republican, narrowly defeating a Democrat named Waker.
38	1877–1879	Lyle Van Nuis	1813–1883	Elected in April 1877. Van Nuis ran as a Democrat, and defeated a Republican named Williamson. Van Nuis previously served as mayor from 1856-1857 and 1861-1863.
37	1875–1877	Isaiah Rolfe	1809–1892	Elected in April 1875. Rolfe ran as a Republican, and defeated a Democrat named Conover.
36	1873–1875	Thomas M. DeRussy		Elected in April 1873. DeRussy ran as a Democrat, and defeated a Republican named Cook.
35	1871–1873	Garret Conover	1817–???	Elected in 1871.
34	1869–1871	George J. Janeway	1806–1889	Elected in 1869.
33	1867–1869	Miles Ross	1828–1903	Elected in 1867.
32	1865–1867	John T. Jenkins	???–1873	He resigned from office.
31	1865	Augustus T. Stout	1816–1865	Elected in 1865. He died in office shortly after being elected.
30	1863–1865	Richard McDonald	1803–1894	He was the first mayor to serve under the charter of 1863, which extended the mayoral term of office from one year to two years.
One-Year Term Mayors (1838–1963)
29	1861–1863	Lyle van Nuis	1813–1883	Elected in 1861 and re-elected in 1862. Previously served as mayor 1856-1857. Would go on to serve as mayor again from 1877-1879.
28	1860–1861	Ezekiel M. Patterson		Elected in 1860.
27	1859–1860	Peter Conover Onderdonk	1811–1894	Elected in 1859.
26	1858–1859	Tunis Van Doren Hoagland	1813–1872	Hoagland was elected to fill vacancy created by John Bayard Kirkpatrick's resignation.
25	1857–1858	John Bayard Kirkpatrick	1795–1864	Elected in 1857. Brother of former New Brunswick Mayor Littleton Kirkpatrick and grandson of former New Brunswick President John Bubenheim Bayard. Resigned from office November 29, 1858.
24	1856–1857	Lyle van Nuis	1813–1883	Elected in 1856. Returned as mayor for two more non-consecutive terms, from 1861-1863 and 1877-1879.
23	1855–1856	Abraham V. Schenck	1821–1902	Elected in 1855. Schenck went on to serve as State Senator, where he was Senate President in 1885.
22	1853–1855	John B. Hill		Elected in 1853 and re-elected in 1854.
21	1852–1853	John Van Dyke	1807–1878	Elected in 1852. Previously served as Mayor 1846–1847.
20	1851–1852	Peter N. Wyckoff		Elected in 1851.
19	1849–1851	David Fitz Randolph		Elected in 1849 and re-elected in 1850.
18	1848–1849	Augustus F. Taylor	1809–1889	Elected in 1848. He was a physician, and son of previous Mayor Augustus R. Taylor.
17	1847–1848	Martin A. Howell		Elected in 1847.
16	1846–1847	John Van Dyke	1807–1878	Elected in 1846. He returned for another term in 1852-1853
15	1845–1846	William H. Leupp	1801–1871	Elected in 1845 and re-elected in 1846.
14	1843–1845	John Acken		Elected in 1843 and re-elected in 1844.
13	1842–1843	Fitz-Randolph Smith	1786–1865	Elected in 1842.
12	1841–1842	Littleton Kirkpatrick	1797–1859	Elected in 1841. A former surrogate Middlesex County, Kirkpatrick defeated incumbent Mayor David W. Vail at the annual town meeting by a vote of 358-304. Kirkpatrick was the grandson of John Bubenheim Bayard, former president of New Brunswick, and went on to be elected to the US Congress, where he served from 1843-1845. His brother John Bayard Kirkpatrick would serve as mayor from 1857-1858.
11	1840–1841	David W. Vail	1796–1842	Elected in 1840.
10	1838–1840	Augustus R. Taylor	1782–1840	Elected in 1838 and re-elected in 1839. Previously served as Mayor from 1824 to 1829. He was the first mayor to serve after the term was changed from five years to one year.
Five-Year Term Mayors (1801–1838)
9	1829–1838	Cornelius Low Hardenbergh	1790–1860	A lawyer, professor, and President of the Bank of New Brunswick, Low Hardenbergh also served as a Trustee at his alma mater, Rutgers College, from 1815-60, and in the NJ State Assembly during 1835.
8	1824–1829	Augustus R. Taylor	1782–1840	Born in New Brunswick, Taylor attended Queen’s College (now known as Rutgers University), and studied medicine at the University of Pennsylvania He was twice Mayor, but did not live to complete his second tenure of office. Taylor was a physician who took over as acting mayor after the death of James Schureman. He was officially appointed on November 19, 1824.
7	1821–1824	James Schureman	1756–1824	Schureman was appointed mayor for the second time following the death of James Bennett. Previously served as mayor from 1801-1813. Schureman died in office on January 22, 1824.
6	1813–1821	James Bennett	1749–1821	James Bennett had a tavern on Queen Street, and was appointed to replace James Schureman after his resignation. Bennett died in office on January 21, 1821.
5	1801–1813	James Schureman	1756–1824	Son of former council president of New Brunswick John Schureman, James Schureman was born in the city. A second Lt. in the Revolutionary War, James Schureman became a merchant and trustee of his alma mater Queen’s College (today known as Rutgers University). He was a member of the Provincial Congress of New Jersey in 1786, a member of the Continental Congress from 1786-88. He also served as one of the city's first representatives in the United States Congress from 1789-1791, and again from 1797-1799, before becoming US Senator in 1799. James Schureman was appointed to serve as mayor by the New Jersey Legislature under the 1801 charter. He resigned on November 12, 1813 and once again returned to the House of Representatives. He would again return to the mayor role from 1821-1824.
Presidents of the Common Council (1784–1801)
	1796–1801	Abraham Schuyler	1741–1815	
	1794–1796	John Bubenheim Bayard	1738–1807	Served as a Colonel in Continental Army during the Revolutionary War. Bayard was also a member of the Continental Congress and Speaker of the Pennsylvania Assembly before relocating to New Brunswick in 1788. In 1794, he was chosen to replace Lewis Dunham as the president of New Brunswick Common Council. He went on to become a judge in the Court of Common Pleas.
	1793–1794	Lewis Ford Dunham	1754-1821	The son of former mayor Azariah Dunham, Dr. Lewis Ford Dunham was a surgeon in the American Army and went on to be lead the State Medical Society from 1791-1816.
	1790–1793	John Schureman	1729–1795	Chosen to replace Azariah Dunham as President of the New Brunswick Common Council after his death.
	1784–1790	Azariah Dunham	1719–1790	Formerly a member of the Continental Congress and the General Assembly, Dunham became the first president of New Brunswick Common Council under the state charter. Died in office January 22, 1790.
Colonial Mayors (1730–1784)
4	1778–1784	William Harrison		Harrison took over as mayor after the death of William Ouke, and was the last colonial mayor of New Brunswick. His term ended when New Jersey granted New Brunswick's state charter on September 30, 1784.
3	1762–1778	William Ouke		As the city's recorder, Ouke took over as mayor after the death of James Hude, and was installed as mayor under the city's second royal charter, which was dated February 12, 1763. Ouke died in office after a combined 42 years as alderman, recorder, or mayor.
2	1747–1762	James Hude		After more than 16 years as the city's recorder, James Hude was appointed the mayor by order of the colonial governor of New Jersey, Jonathan Belcher, in August 1747. He died in office in November 1762.
1	1730–1747	Thomas Farmer	1675–1752	Thomas Farmer was the first mayor of New Brunswick, appointed under the royal charter granted December 30, 1730 by Colonel John Montgomerie, the colonial governor of New York and New Jersey. Farmer served for over 16 years, until mid-1747.
