= Amos Clark Jr. =

American politician

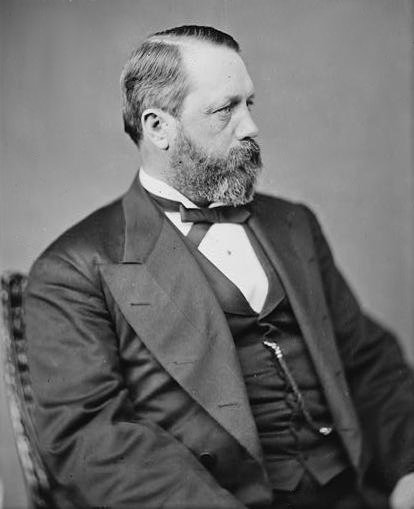

Member of the U.S. House of Representatives from New Jersey's 3rd district
- In office March 4, 1873 – March 3, 1875
- Preceded by: John T. Bird
- Succeeded by: Miles Ross

Member of the New Jersey Senate
- In office 1866-1869

Personal details
- Born: November 8, 1828 Brooklyn, New York
- Died: October 31, 1912 (aged 83) Boston, Massachusetts
- Party: Republican
- Profession: Politician, Businessman

Amos Clark Jr. (November 8, 1828 – October 31, 1912) was an American Republican Party politician and businessman who represented New Jersey's 3rd congressional district for one term from 1873 to 1875.

== Early life and career ==
Born in Brooklyn, New York, Clark engaged in business in New York City while living in Elizabeth, New Jersey, where he was also largely interested in real estate.

== Political career ==
He was a member of the Elizabeth City Council in 1865 and 1866, served in the New Jersey Senate from 1866 to 1869 and was elected as a Republican to the United States House of Representatives in 1872, serving from 1873 to 1875, being unsuccessful for reelection in 1874.

Afterwards, Clark retired to his residence in Norfolk County, Massachusetts, but retained business interests back in Elizabeth. He died in Boston, Massachusetts, on October 31, 1912, and was interred in Evergreen Cemetery in Hillside, New Jersey.

U.S. House of Representatives
Preceded by John T. Bird	Member of the U.S. House of Representatives from New Jersey's 3rd congressional district March 4, 1873 – March 3, 1875	Succeeded by Miles Ross
