= Micah Williams (painter) =

American painter

- Born: 1782; Hempstead, New York or Essex County, New Jersey
- Died: November 21, 1837 (aged 54–55); New Brunswick, New Jersey
- Known for: Portrait painting

Micah Williams (1782 – November 21, 1837) was a New Jersey folk art painter.

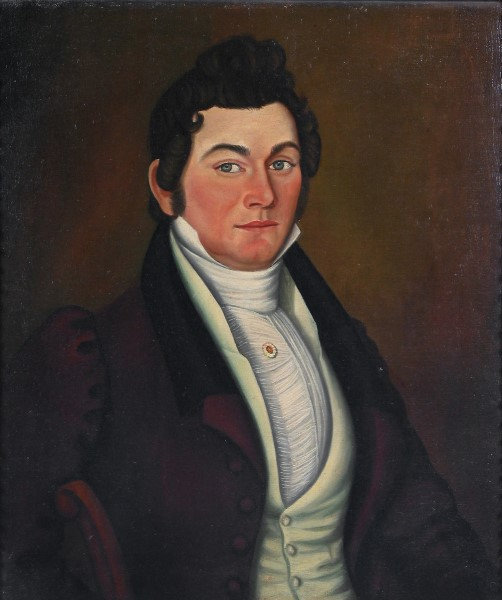
Gentleman in a Brown Frock Coat attributed to Micah Williams

He was most likely born near Hempstead, New York or Essex County, New Jersey in 1782. From 1829 to 1833 he worked in New York City. He also worked as a portrait artist in and around New Brunswick and Monmouth County, New Jersey. The earliest work attributed to him is from around 1790. In 1806 he married in New Brunswick, New Jersey. The last work attributed to him was from 1833. He died in New Brunswick, New Jersey on November 21, 1837. He was initially buried in New Brunswick but was later reinterred in Van Liew Cemetery in North Brunswick, New Jersey.
