= John T. Bird =

American politician

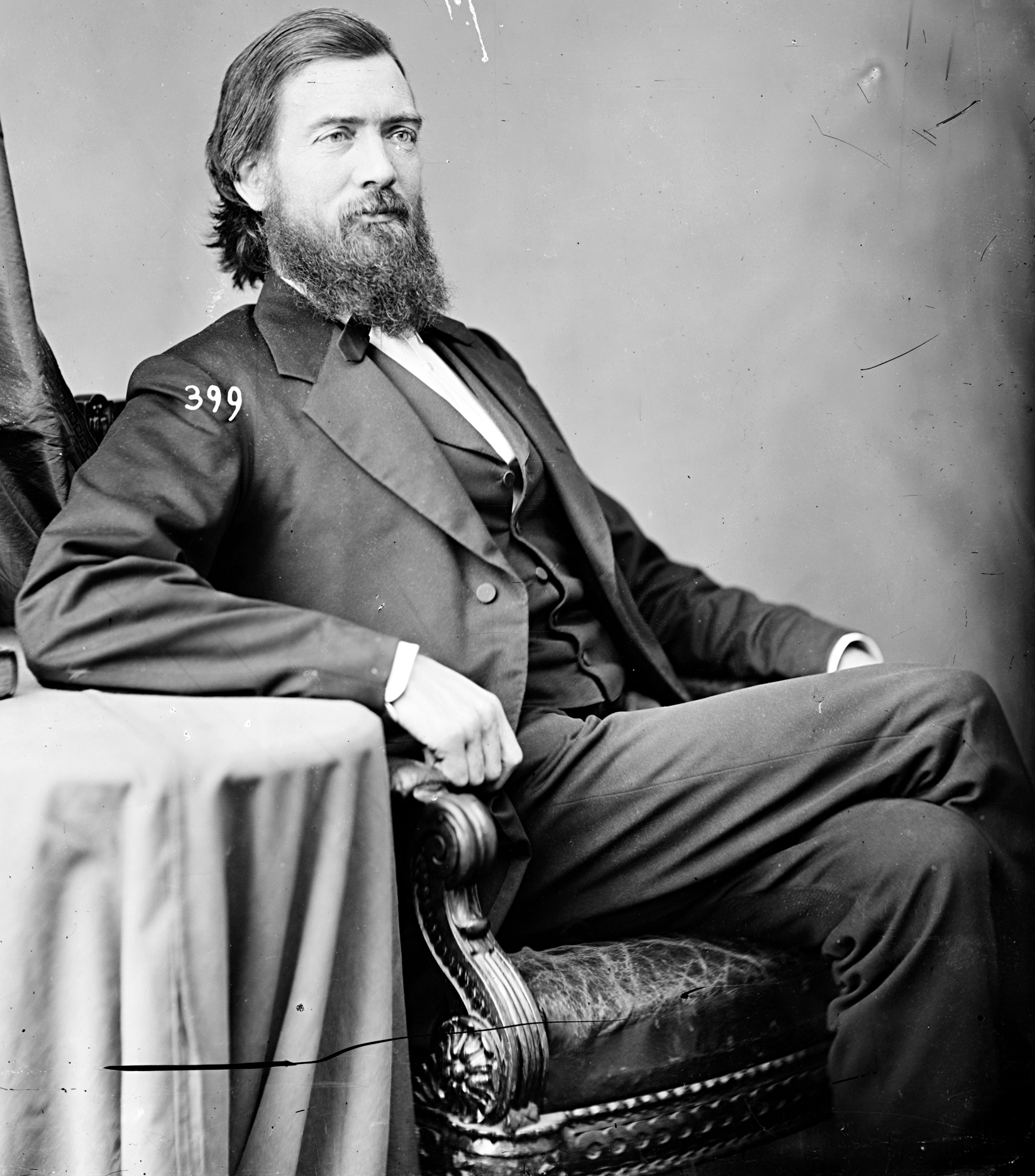

Member of the U.S. House of Representatives from New Jersey's 3rd district
- In office March 4, 1869 – March 3, 1873
- Preceded by: Charles Sitgreaves
- Succeeded by: Amos Clark, Jr.

Personal details
- Born: John Taylor Bird; August 16, 1829 Bloomsbury, New Jersey, U.S.
- Died: May 6, 1911 (aged 81) Trenton, New Jersey, U.S.
- Resting place: Riverview Cemetery
- Party: Democratic
- Profession: Politician

John Taylor Bird (August 16, 1829, Bloomsbury, New Jersey – May 6, 1911, Trenton, New Jersey) was an American politician and businessman who represented New Jersey's 3rd congressional district for two terms from 1869 to 1873.

== Early life and education ==
Bird was born in Bloomsbury in Bethlehem Township, New Jersey on August 16, 1829. He attended the public schools, and a classical academy at Hackettstown, New Jersey.

== Career ==
He studied law, was admitted to the bar in 1855 and commenced practice in Bloomsbury, New Jersey. He moved to Clinton, New Jersey in 1858. He was prosecutor of the pleas for Hunterdon County from 1862 to 1867. He moved to Flemington, New Jersey in 1865.

=== Congress ===
Bird was elected as a Democrat to the Forty-first and Forty-second Congresses, serving in office from March 4, 1869 – March 3, 1873, but was not a candidate for renomination in 1872.

=== Later career ===
After leaving Congress, he resumed the practice of law in Flemington. He was a member of the New Jersey constitutional convention in 1876. He moved to Trenton, New Jersey, in 1882. Bird was vice chancellor of New Jersey from 1882 to 1896 and master in chancery from 1900 to 1909.

== Death ==
He died in Trenton on May 6, 1911, and was interred there in Riverview Cemetery.

U.S. House of Representatives
Preceded by John T. Bird	Member of the U.S. House of Representatives from New Jersey's 3rd congressional district March 4, 1869 – March 3, 1873	Succeeded by Amos Clark, Jr.
