= Joseph Bavaria =

American surgeon and academic

Dr. Joseph E. Bavaria M.D., FACS, FRCS (RCSEd) (Note: The FRCS (Edinburgh) is an "ad hom" recognition.)
- Born: 1957 (age 68–69)
- Education: Tulane University, Tulane University School of Medicine
- Occupations: Surgeon, academic
- Years active: 1983-present
- Medical career
- Awards: The Society of Thoracic Surgeons’ (STS) 2022 Distinguished Service Award
- Awards: Penn Health System Innovation Prize

Academic work
- Discipline: Surgery
- Sub-discipline: Cardiothoracic surgery
- Institutions: The University of Pennsylvania (Professor of Surgery), European Association for Cardio-Thoracic Surgery (International Councilor), Penn Cardiovascular Surgery (Roberts-Measey Professor and Vice-Chair), Penn Aorta Center (Founder and co-director)
- Main interests: cardio-aortic surgery, thoracic aortic surgery, aortic dissection, aortic root, ascending aortic reconstruction, aortic arch surgery, lung transplant, lung cancer, thoracoscopy, pleurodesis, aortic disease, aortic dissections, cerebral protection, aortic valve repairs, and valve-sparing procedures
- Website: josephbavaria.com

Joseph E. Bavaria, M.D., FACS, FRCS (Edin) ad hom, (born 1957) is an American cardiothoracic surgeon a professor of surgery at the University of Pennsylvania and Director of its Thoracic Aortic Surgery Program. (Note: a comprehensive program that addresses all aspects of aortic disease, covering thoracic aortic reconstruction and Marfan's Syndrome across multiple disciplines.) Bavaria is known as a leading figure in clinical trials for catheter-based aortic valve replacement (TAVR), thoracic aortic surgery, and aortic endograft procedures (TEVAR). He wrote more than 600 research papers and founded the Penn Aortic Center. Bavaria served as the 52nd president of the Society of Thoracic Surgeons (STS) from 2016 to 2017, the 3rd President of the Thoracic Surgery Foundation (TSF) (2019-2022), the Chairman of The Society of Thoracic Surgeons/ACC TVT Registry Steering Committee (2017-2020) (Note: "The STS/ACC TVT Registry, created through a collaboration between STS and the American College of Cardiology (ACC), monitors patient safety and real-world outcomes related to transcatheter valve replacement and repair procedures – emerging treatments for valve disease patients. Employing state-of-the-art heart valve technology, transcatheter heart valve procedures provide new treatment options for patients who are not eligible for conventional heart valve replacement or repair surgery.") and an International Councilor of the European Association for Cardio-Thoracic Surgery (EACTS) (2021-2024) Bavaria has performed more than 9,000 surgeries throughout his career as of 2019.

== Early life and education ==
Bavaria was born in 1957 to Elizabeth "Janee" Swank and Edward Bavaria in Little Rock, Arkansas. His father worked as a pilot for the United States Airforce until he started working for General Electric in 1962. Bavaria attended a Cincinnati kindergarten school until third grade. Then, his family moved first to Dallas, Texas and then to Bonn, Germany where they lived from 1967 to 1970. In Germany, his father worked with the embassy thanks to a public-private partnership between General Electric and the German Airforce. Bavaria attended the American School on the Rhine. In 1970, his father was promoted to Head of Engine Division in Europe at General Electric and the family moved to Paris before returning to Cincinnati four years later in 1974. Bavaria graduated from the Indian Hill High School. (Note: Bavaria played golf for his high school in the state championships at Ohio State University.) He attended Tulane University as an underdraguate and spent a year as an honors exchange student in Edinburgh, Scotland. He graduated with honors from Tulane University in 1979 with a degree in chemical engineering and then attended Tulane University School of Medicine. During his years at Tulane's Medical School, he had an externship in cardiac and thoracic surgery in Cincinnati where he decided to pursue a career in cardiothoracic surgery. He graduated from Tulane's Medical School and was awarded the "Gold Scalpel Award", the highest surgery honor for a medical student. In July 1983, he started his residency as a surgeon at the Hospital of the University of Pennsylvania (HUP).

== Career ==
Bavaria finished his residency at HUP in 1992 and started working as an assistant professor of Thoracic and Cardiovascular Surgery at The University of Pennsylvania until 2004 when he was awarded the Brooke Roberts–William Maul Measey Professorship of Surgery.

During his years teaching at Penn, Bavaria has written more than 600 research paper and was an associate editor at The Annals of Thoracic Surgery.

Bavaria holds the role of Primary Investigator at Penn, overseeing the continuous transcatheter aortic valve trials. He plays a prominent role in a dynamic cardio-aortic clinical research group, serving as the main investigator for more than 40 industry-sponsored FDA IDE phase I, II, and III trials. He is also actively involved in ongoing NIH-funded research projects.

== Select publications ==
- Mack, Michael J., Martin B. Leon, Craig R. Smith, D. Craig Miller, Jeffrey W. Moses, E. Murat Tuzcu, John G. Webb et al. "5-year outcomes of transcatheter aortic valve replacement or surgical aortic valve replacement for high surgical risk patients with aortic stenosis (PARTNER 1): a randomised controlled trial." The Lancet 385, no. 9986 (2015): 2477-2484. doi:10.1016/S0140-6736(15)60308-7
- Makkar, Raj R., Gregory P. Fontana, Hasan Jilaihawi, Samir Kapadia, Augusto D. Pichard, Pamela S. Douglas, Vinod H. Thourani et al. "Transcatheter aortic-valve replacement for inoperable severe aortic stenosis." New England Journal of Medicine 366, no. 18 (2012): 1696-1704. doi:10.1056/NEJMoa1202277
- Généreux, Philippe, John G. Webb, Lars G. Svensson, Susheel K. Kodali, Lowell F. Satler, William F. Fearon, Charles J. Davidson et al. "Vascular complications after transcatheter aortic valve replacement: insights from the PARTNER (Placement of AoRTic TraNscathetER Valve) trial." Journal of the American College of Cardiology 60, no. 12 (2012): 1043-1052.
- Smith, Craig R., Martin B. Leon, Michael J. Mack, D. Craig Miller, Jeffrey W. Moses, Lars G. Svensson, E. Murat Tuzcu et al. "Transcatheter versus surgical aortic-valve replacement in high-risk patients." New England Journal of Medicine 364, no. 23 (2011): 2187-2198. doi:10.1056/NEJMoa1103510
- Bavaria, Joseph E., Jehangir J. Appoo, Michel S. Makaroun, Joel Verter, Zi-Fan Yu, R. Scott Mitchell, and Gore TAG Investigators. "Endovascular stent grafting versus open surgical repair of descending thoracic aortic aneurysms in low-risk patients: a multicenter comparative trial." The Journal of thoracic and cardiovascular surgery 133, no. 2 (2007): 369-377. doi:10.1016/j.jtcvs.2006.07.040
- Svensson, Lars G., Nicholas T. Kouchoukos, D. Craig Miller, Joseph E. Bavaria, Joseph S. Coselli, Michael A. Curi, Holger Eggebrecht et al. "Expert consensus document on the treatment of descending thoracic aortic disease using endovascular stent-grafts." The Annals of thoracic surgery 85, no. 1 (2008): S1-S41. doi:10.1016/j.athoracsur.2007.10.099
- Makaroun, Michel S., Ellen D. Dillavou, Stephen T. Kee, Gregorio Sicard, Elliot Chaikof, Joseph Bavaria, David Williams, Richard P. Cambria, R. Scott Mitchell, and GORE TAG Investigators. "Endovascular treatment of thoracic aortic aneurysms: results of the phase II multicenter trial of the GORE TAG thoracic endoprosthesis." Journal of vascular surgery 41, no. 1 (2005): 1-9. doi:10.1016/j.jvs.2004.10.046
- Keane, Martin G., Susan E. Wiegers, Ted Plappert, Alberto Pochettino, Joseph E. Bavaria, and Martin G. St John Sutton. "Bicuspid aortic valves are associated with aortic dilatation out of proportion to coexistent valvular lesions." Circulation 102, no. suppl_3 (2000): Iii-35.doi:10.1161/circ.102.suppl_3.III-35

== Personal life ==
During the second year of his surgical residency at the Hospital of the University of Pennsylvania, Bavaria had met Kimberly Franco, a school psychologist. They married four years later. Bavaria and Franco have two children, Melanie and Edward.
