= Littleton Kirkpatrick =

American politician (1797-1859)

Member of the U.S. House of Representatives from New Jersey's 4th district
- In office March 4, 1843 – March 3, 1845
- Preceded by: John Bancker Aycrigg; William Halstead; John Patterson Bryan Maxwell; Joseph Fitz Randolph; Charles C. Stratton; Thomas J. Yorke (Elected statewide on a Whig Party general ticket)
- Succeeded by: Joseph E. Edsall

Personal details
- Born: October 19, 1797 New Brunswick, New Jersey, U.S.
- Died: August 15, 1859 (aged 61) Saratoga Springs, New York, U.S.
- Resting place: Van Liew Cemetery, North Brunswick, New Jersey
- Party: Democratic
- Profession: Politician

Littleton Kirkpatrick (October 19, 1797 – August 15, 1859) was an American Whig Party politician, who represented New Jersey's 4th congressional district in the United States House of Representatives for one term from 1853 to 1855.

He was the son of Andrew Kirkpatrick and the former Jane Bayard, and grandson of John Bubenheim Bayard.

== Biography ==
Kirkpatrick was born in New Brunswick, New Jersey, on October 19, 1797. He graduated from Princeton College in 1815. He studied law in Washington, D.C., was admitted to the bar in 1821, and returned to New Brunswick to begin his practice. He was master in court chancery in 1824, and surrogate of Middlesex County from 1831 to 1836.

=== Political career ===
He was Mayor of New Brunswick, New Jersey, from 1841 to 1842. His grandfather John Bubenheim Bayard had been elected mayor of the city in 1790.

Kirkpatrick served as a trustee of Rutgers College from 1841 to 1859. He was elected as a Democrat to the Twenty-eighth Congress, serving in office one term from March 4, 1843, to March 3, 1845. He was chairman of the Committee on Revisal and Unfinished Business.

=== Death and burial ===
He died in Saratoga Springs, New York, on August 15, 1859. He was interred in the Presbyterian Cemetery in New Brunswick. He was reinterred in Van Liew Cemetery, North Brunswick, New Jersey, in 1921.

== Legacy ==
His wife, Sophia, remained in the city of New Brunswick after Littleton's death. When she died on March 6, 1871, at the age of 68, she named Rutgers College as her estate's residuary legatee. Rutgers used the proceeds of this bequest to build Kirkpatrick Chapel in 1873. Today, this chapel is located on the historic Queen's Campus section of Rutgers's College Avenue Campus.

U.S. House of Representatives
Preceded by James Henderson Imlay	Member of the U.S. House of Representatives from New Jersey's 4th congressional district March 4, 1843 – March 3, 1845	Succeeded by Joseph E. Edsall
