= Charity Dean =

American public health physician

- Education: Tulane University School of Medicine and Tulane University School of Public Health and Tropical Medicine
- Occupation: CEO / Public Health Physician
- Organization: The Public Health Company
- Website: https://www.phc.health/

Charity Dean is an American public health physician who is known for her work as the assistant director of the California Department of Public Health in 2020 during the COVID-19 pandemic in the United States. She is the co-founder and CEO of The Public Health Company.

== Early life and education ==
Dean grew up in rural Oregon and became interested in becoming a doctor and studying infectious disease as a young child. She completed a B.S. in Microbiology at Oregon State University, an M.D. from Tulane University School of Medicine, and a Master of Public Health and Tropical Medicine from Tulane University School of Public Health and Tropical Medicine. From 2008 through 2011, she was an internal medicine resident at Santa Barbara Cottage Hospital.

== Career ==
As a public health official in Santa Barbara County, Dean gained experience with containment of infectious disease outbreaks, including meningitis in 2013 and tuberculosis in 2014. From 2011 through 2014, she was the deputy public health officer for the Santa Barbara County Public Health Department, and from 2014 through 2018, she was the public health officer for the Santa Barbara County Public Health Department.

In late 2018, she became the assistant director of the California Department of Public Health. In January 2020, she began to warn state officials about COVID-19, based on reports from China, and continued for months. In April 2020, she was also appointed as co-chair of the California COVID-19 testing task force, which included efforts to expand access to testing. Her work included coordination with elected officials and the White House Coronavirus Task Force. She left her position as the assistant director of the California Department of Public Health in July 2020, after submitting her resignation on June 4, and then began "tweeting news and information, some of which could be seen as a comment on California’s COVID testing and response," according to Deadline in August 2020.

In July 2020, she was featured in the ABC News 20/20 investigative report American Catastrophe, and in May 2021, she was featured in a 60 Minutes broadcast about the book The Premonition by Michael Lewis. She is one of the experts profiled in the book, and named by Lewis as "one of the people who saw the real danger of the virus before the rest of the country did," according to NPR.

In August 2020, she co-founded The Public Health Company, which has created software to assist the public health community and businesses with managing the risks of infectious disease. She has also continued to publicly offer her expert opinion about COVID-19 responses and responding to pandemics generally.

== Honors and awards ==
- 2018 Physician of the Year award from the Central Coast Medical Association
- 2018 Women of the Year recognition from Senator Jackson and Assemblywoman Limon
