= 1799 New Jersey gubernatorial election =

- October 29, 1799
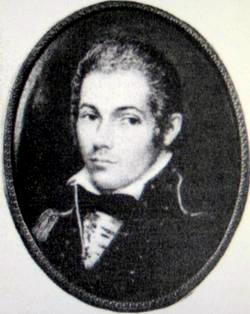

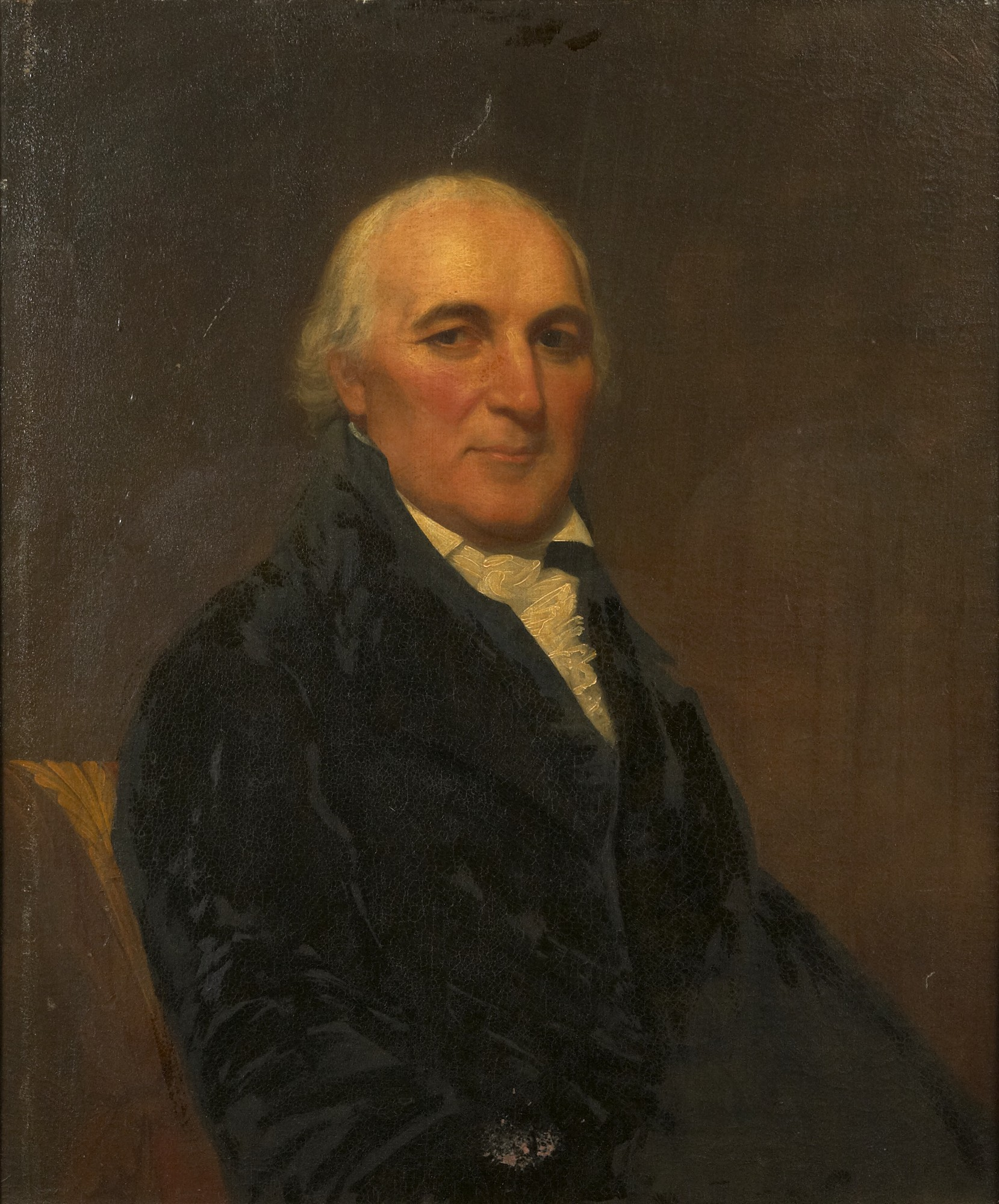
Nominee	Richard Howell	Andrew Kirkpatrick
Party	Federalist
Popular vote	33	15
Percentage	68.75%	31.25%
Governor before election
Richard Howell
Federalist
Elected Governor
Richard Howell
Federalist

The 1799 New Jersey gubernatorial election was held on October 29, 1799, in order to elect the Governor of New Jersey. Incumbent Federalist Governor Richard Howell was re-elected by the New Jersey General Assembly against candidate Andrew Kirkpatrick.

== General election ==
On election day, October 29, 1799, incumbent Federalist Governor Richard Howell was re-elected by the New Jersey General Assembly by a margin of 18 votes against candidate Andrew Kirkpatrick, thereby retaining Federalist control over the office of Governor. Howell was sworn in for his seventh term that same day.

=== Results ===
New Jersey gubernatorial election, 1799
Party	Candidate	Votes	%
Federalist	Richard Howell (incumbent)	33	68.75%
	Andrew Kirkpatrick	15	31.25%
Total votes		48	100.00%
Federalist hold			
