= Paul Finger =

American ophthalmologist

Paul T. Finger
- Born: November 26, 1955 (age 70); New York, NY
- Education: Tulane University School of Medicine
- Years active: 23
- Known for: Inventing new treatments, EYECANCERBIG
- Medical career
- Profession: Ophthalmologist
- Institutions: New York Eye and Ear Infirmary, New York University School of Medicine
- Sub-specialties: Oncology (Cancer)
- Research: Melanomas, Macular Degeneration
- Awards: America's Best Doctors 2008

Paul T. Finger is an American ophthalmologist specializing in ocular oncology. Finger has pioneered the use of palladium-103 plaque radiation to treat choroidal melanoma and 3D and high-frequency ultrasound to image intraocular tumors.

== Education ==
Finger received his medical doctorate from Tulane Medical School in 1982. He completed his residency at Manhattan Eye, Ear and Throat Hospital, and his fellowship in ocular oncology at North Shore Hospital in Manhasset, New York.

He is now a Clinical Professor of Ophthalmology at New York University School of Medicine as well as in New York Eye and Ear Infirmary of Mount Sinai and both Tisch and Manhattan Eye, Ear and Throat Hospitals.

== Career ==
Finger is certified by the American Board of Ophthalmology and is a Fellow of both the American College of Surgeons and the American Academy of Ophthalmology.

His research has focused on melanoma of the choroid, ciliary body and iris. He has written extensively about new ways to detect and treat retinoblastoma, conjunctival melanoma, squamous carcinoma, metastatic cancer to the eye and orbital tumors.

He has helped produce multiple medical textbooks on age-related macular degeneration and eye cancer.

== See also ==
- Eye cancer
