= Tulane University School of Medicine =

Medical school in New Orleans, Louisiana, US

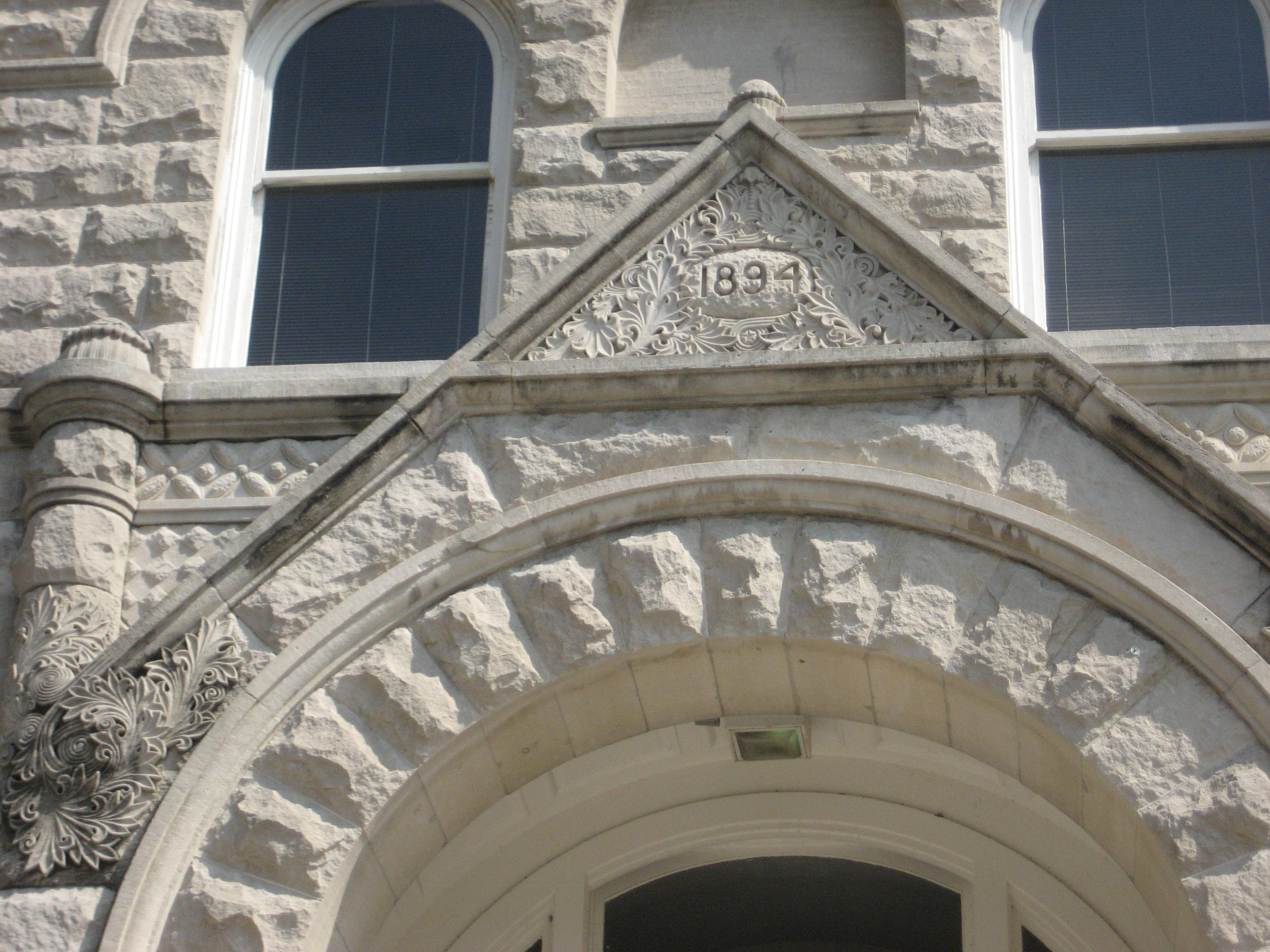
- Gibson Hall
- Former name: Medical College of Louisiana
- Type: Private medical school
- Established: 1834; 192 years ago
- Parent institution: Tulane University
- Dean: L. Lee Hamm III
- Faculty: 309 (full-time); 1,289 (part-time)
- Students: 640
- Location: New Orleans, Louisiana, United States; 29.9550°N 90.0770°W
- Campus: Urban
- Website: medicine.tulane.edu

The Tulane University School of Medicine is the medical school of Tulane University and is located in the Medical District of the New Orleans Central Business District in New Orleans, Louisiana, United States.

== History ==
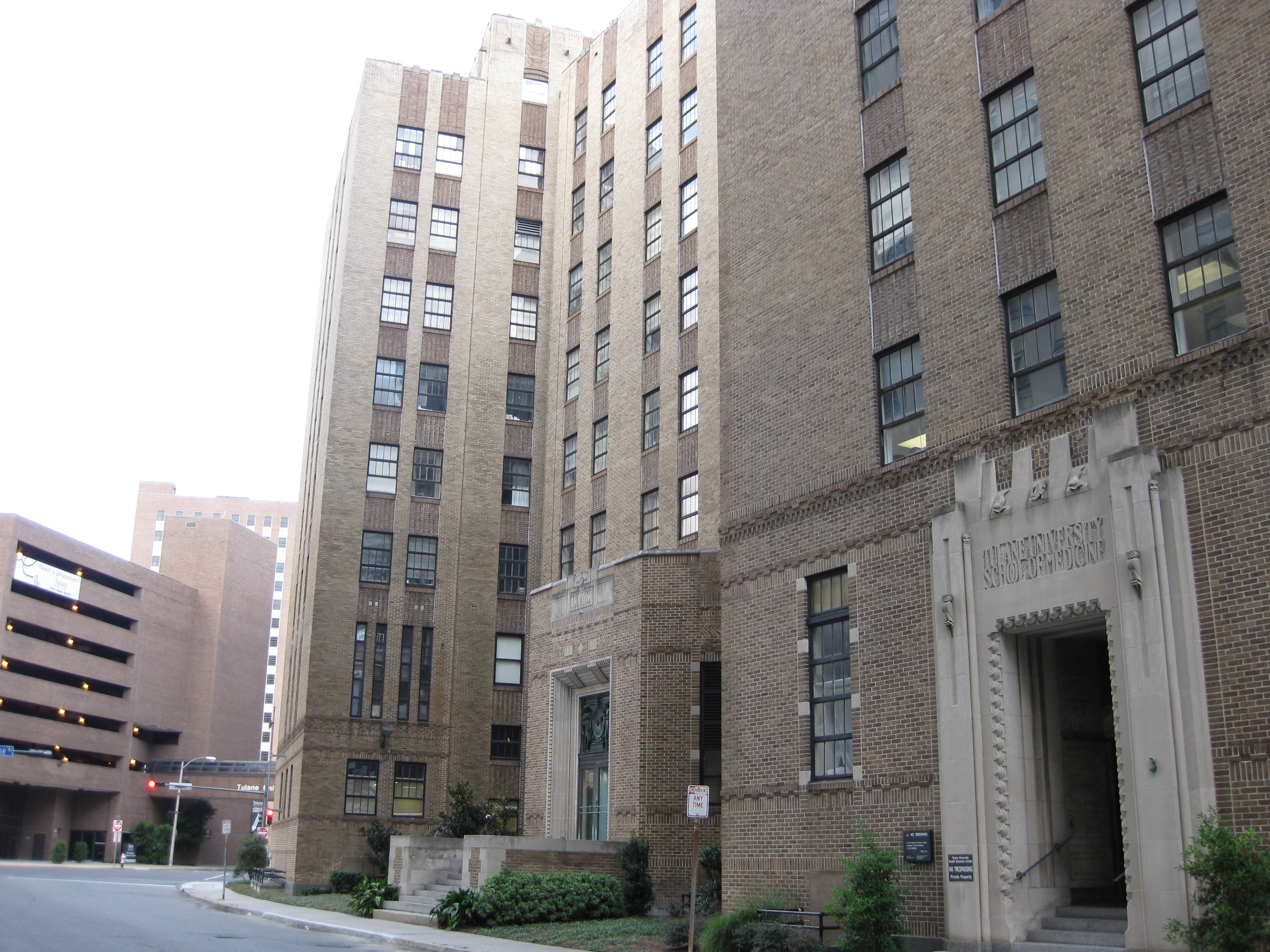
Tulane School of Medicine, located in the Medical District of downtown New Orleans.

The school was founded in 1834 as the Medical College of Louisiana and is the fifteenth oldest medical school in the United States and the second oldest in the Deep South. The first classes were held in 1835 at a variety of locations, including Charity Hospital and the Strangers Unitarian Church.

=== Late 1800s to present ===
The first permanent building for the school was constructed in the French Quarter in 1844. In 1893, the school moved to Canal Street in the Richardson building, and then shortly after to the Hutchinson Building, also on Canal. Finally, in 1930, the school moved to its current location—the Hutchinson Memorial Building—on Tulane Avenue, next to Charity Hospital.

In 2007, the school acquired the Murphy Oil Building on S. Robertson by donation. The Murphy building houses the DeBakey Educational Center, Leone Learning Center, a simulation center, a student lounge with a gym, and several administrative offices.

== Admissions and research ==
The school has highly competitive admissions, accepting only 175 medical students from more than 12,000 applications. About 40 percent of the students in each class are concurrently enrolled as candidates for the Master of Public Health degree in the Celia Scott Weatherhead School of Public Health and Tropical Medicine. It is estimated that Tulane University has graduated more than 40 percent of all physicians in the U.S. who have earned both M.D. and master of public health degrees.

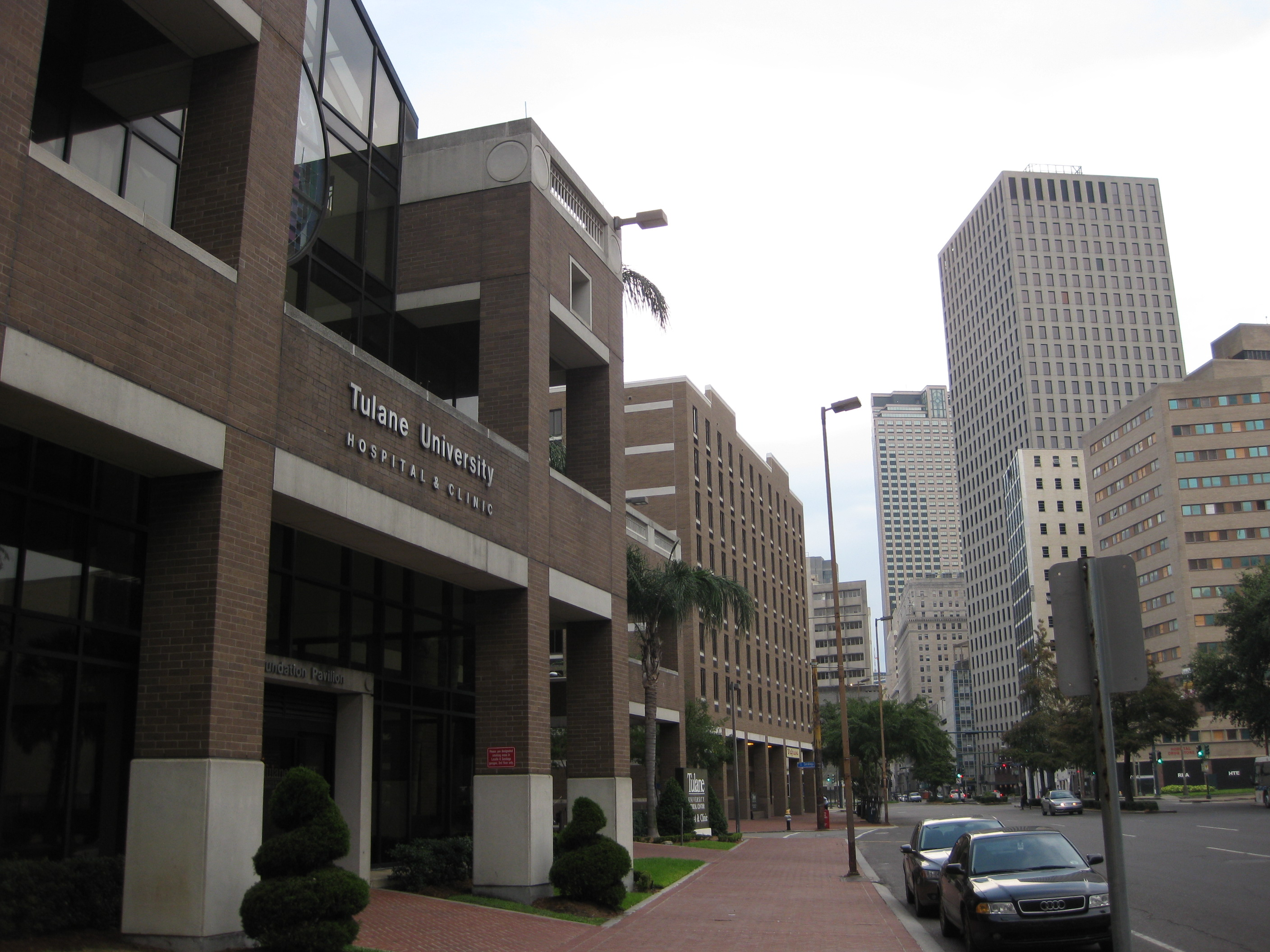
Tulane University Hospital, located in the Medical District of downtown New Orleans and adjacent to the School of Medicine.

In 2001, the Tulane Center for Gene Therapy started as the first major center in the U.S. to focus on research using adult stem cells.

Today, the medical school is but one part of the Tulane University Health Sciences Center, which includes the School of Medicine, the School of Public Health and Tropical Medicine, the University Health Service, the Tulane National Primate Research Center, the U.S.-Japan Biomedical Research Laboratories, and the Tulane/Xavier Center for Bioenvironmental Research. Most components of the Health Sciences Center are located in the heart of New Orleans, in the medical district that comprises Tulane facilities and the LSU/Charity Hospital center just north of the New Orleans Central Business District. It comprises 23 academic departments.

On August 31, 2009, Louisiana Governor Bobby Jindal along with Tulane President Scott Cowen and Louisiana State University System President John V. Lombardi approved a plan to establish both schools as board members for the future $1.1 billion University Medical Center New Orleans. Ground was broken in 2011 and the hospital opened on August 1, 2015.

In 2022, LCMC Health and Tulane University announced that the organizations would form a partnership. Under this partnership, Tulane Medical Center, Lakeview Regional Medical Center, and Tulane Lakeside Hospital joined LCMC Health’s network of healthcare facilities. In January 2024, a majority of services provided at Tulane Medical Center shifted to University Medical Center New Orleans and East Jefferson General Hospital. East Jefferson General Hospital is now the clinical home for Tulane University School of Medicine.

In July 2026, Tulane University became the first MD-PhD program in Louisiana to be designated as a Medical Scientist Training Program (MSTP), securing a $1.67 million grant from the National Institutes of Health (NIH). The program offers two admission pathways, one admitting students directly into the combined MD-PhD program with tuition waivers and a stipend throughout their training, and another for current medical students awarded graduate school tuition waivers and stipends but not medical school tuition waivers.

== Facilities ==
Tulane's medical library, The Rudolph Matas Health Sciences Library, is named after the renowned Professor of Surgery at Tulane University Rudolph Matas, despite the journal Science stating of Matas that "his colleagues have felt for many years that by consulting him they could extract more information from his encyclopedic mind than they could obtain from a visit to a library."

The Tulane Center for Advanced Medical Simulation and Team Training gives medical students, residents, practicing physicians, nurses, technicians, first responders and other healthcare providers the opportunity to learn and perfect the latest techniques and best practices for patient care and safety. The Tulane Sim Center features 14,000 square feet (1,300 m^{2}) of simulation and meeting space for hands-on training, instruction and skills assessment including an emergency room, intensive care unit, operating room, labor & delivery room, four hospital patient rooms, four office exam rooms, and a nursing station. The Tulane University: Standardized Patient Center through Foundations in Medicine is the first to pilot low-cost virtual reality through Google Cardboard for first-year medical students.

== Notable alumni and faculty ==
George E. Burch

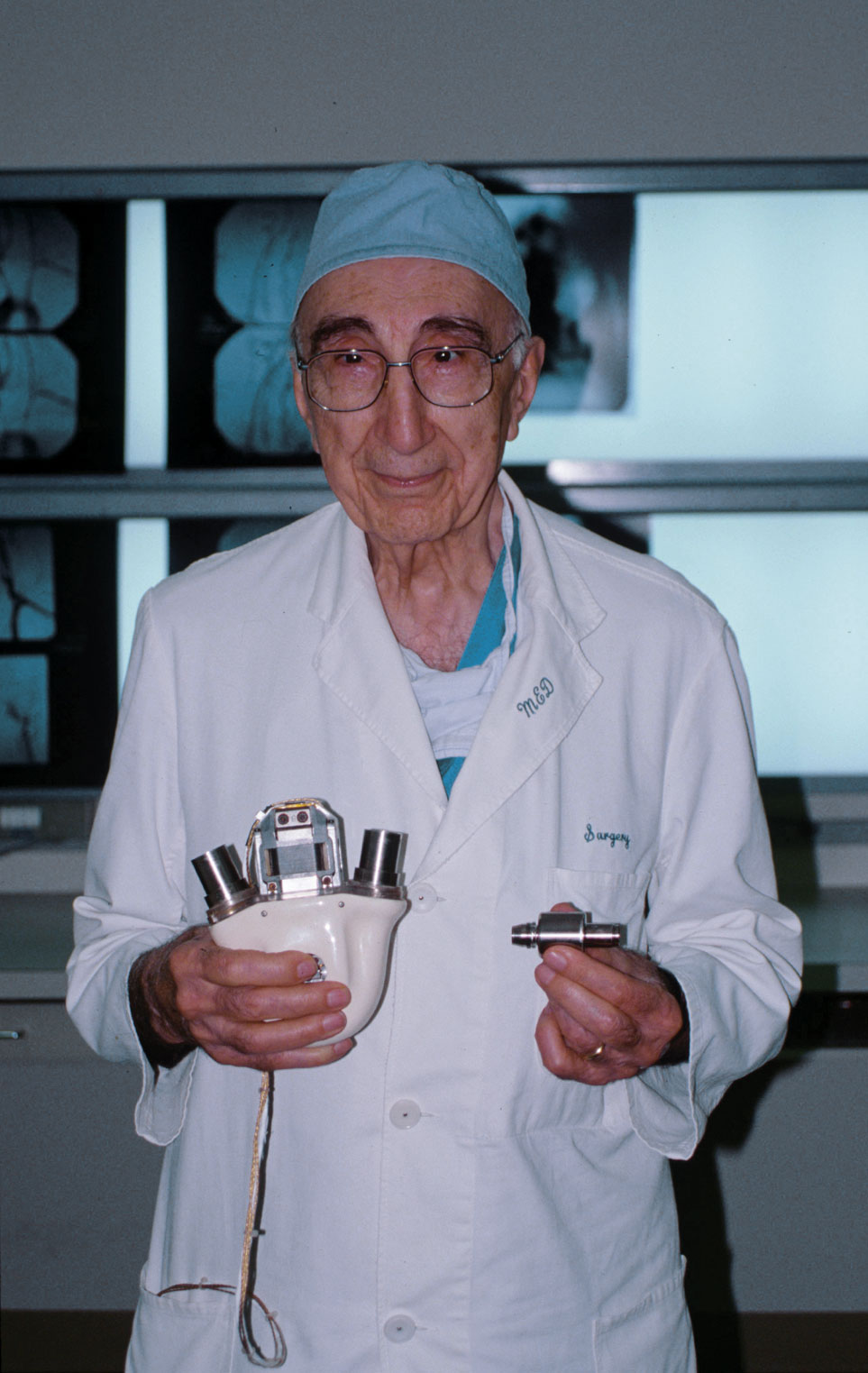
Michael DeBakey, renowned heart surgeon who invented the roller pump

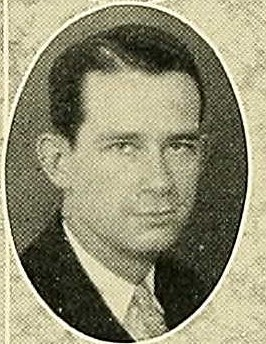
Leslie Vaughn Rush, orthopedic surgeon and inventor of the Rush pin

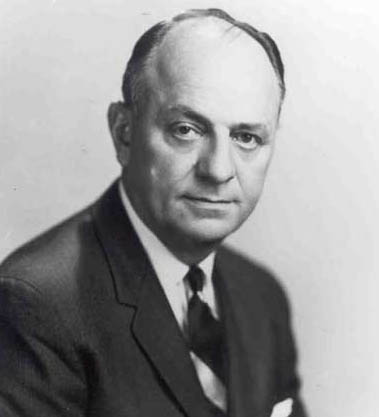
Luther Terry, former U.S. Surgeon General, who issued the first warning that tobacco is a health hazard

- James Andrews, M.D., Former house staff, orthopedics (1969–1972), internationally known orthopedic surgeon and sports medicine specialist. Founder of American Sports Medicine Institute, member of the Sports medicine Committee of the United States Olympic Committee. team physician for a number of professional and collegiate teams. Surgeon to numerous professional athletes including Jack Nicklaus, Michael Jordan, Emmitt Smith, John Smoltz, Brett Favre, Drew Brees, Troy Aikman, Charles Barkley, Bo Jackson, and many others.
- Charles Cassidy (C.C.) Bass, M.D., 1899, pioneer researcher on malaria, hookworm, and dental caries; dean, Tulane School of Medicine, 1922-40 (Tulane's Golden Years).
- Elizabeth Bass, M.D., 1911, one of the first women faculty at the medical school, three years before women were admitted as students
- Stanhope Bayne-Jones, Military Physician and Academic, noted for his contributions to the link between smoking and cancer.
- Cyril Y. Bowers, M.D., Emeritus Professor of Medicine
- George E. Burch, M.D., 1933, internationally known cardiologist; Editor, American Heart Journal. 1959-1982; chairman of the World Health Organization Expert Advisory Panel on Cardiovascular Diseases and chairman of the advisory committee to the U.S. Army on Environmental Medicine and Physiology involved in successfully sending the first two chimpanzees into space, continuing as a consultant to NASA
- Alston Callahan M.D., 1933, pioneer in the field of reconstructive eye surgery; established the Eye Foundation Hospital in Birmingham, Alabama; instrumental in starting the Ophthalmology Department at the University of Alabama School of Medicine and served as first chairman
- Jay Cavanaugh, Ph.D, 1994, member, California State Board of Pharmacy (1980–90), director, American Alliance for Medical Cannabis, 2001
- Max Dale Cooper, M.D., M, 1957, Former House Staff (Peds), 2019 Albert Lasker Award for Basic Medical Research (with Jacques Miller) for their discovery of the two distinct classes of lymphocytes, B and T cells – a monumental achievement that provided the organizing principle of the adaptive immune system and launched the course of modern immunology
- Harold Cummins, M.D., anatomist, Emeritus professor of Anatomy
- Charity Dean, M.D., MPH&TM, epidemiologist, assistant director of the California Department of Public Health in 2020 during the COVID-19 pandemic in the United States, co-founder and CEO of The Public Health Company.
- Michael E. DeBakey, M.D., 1932, pioneer of modern medicine (cardiovascular surgery) and recipient of the Congressional Gold Medal
- David John Doukas, M.D., Professor and James A. Knight Chair of Medical Humanities and Ethics in Medicine
- H. Tristram Engelhardt, Jr., M.D.; Ph.D. Tulane 1972. American philosopher specializing in continental philosophy and medical ethics. Professor of philosophy at Rice University.
- Paul Finger, M.D., 1982, pioneered the use of palladium-103 plaque radiation to treat choroidal melanoma and 3D and high-frequency ultrasound to image intraocular tumors.
- Arthur Gottlieb M.D., faculty (1975–1988), chairman of the Department of Microbiology and Immunology and professor of Medicine
- Louis J. Ignarro, faculty (1973–1985), Nobel Prize in Physiology or Medicine (1998)
- Thomas Naum James, M.D., 1949, director, World Health Organization cardiovascular center
- Ruth L. Kirschstein, M.D., 1951, director, National Institutes of Health, for whom the Kirschstein NRSA grant program is named
- Rudolph Matas, M.D., 1880, "father of vascular surgery"
- William Larimer Mellon, Jr., M.D., 1953, founder, Albert Schweitzer Hospital, Haiti
- Alton Ochsner, faculty, founder of Ochsner Clinic, pioneer anti-smoking advocate, president of the American Cancer Society, president of the American College of Surgeons, president of the International Society of Surgeons, chairman of the Section on Surgery for the American Medical Association, and president of the Alton Ochsner Medical Foundation; received the Distinguished Service Award of the American Medical Association in 1967; popularized blood typing and blood transfusion in Europe; physician to Argentina's Juan Perón.
- Donald J. Palmisano, M.D., A&S 1960, M 1963, president of the American Medical Association.
- Felix Octave Pavy, M.D. 1904, member of the Louisiana House of Representatives for St. Landry Parish from 1932 to 1936.
- Jesse Dean Riley, M.D. 1916, Superintendent of the Arkansas Tuberculosis Sanatorium in Booneville from 1930 to 1955.
- Leslie Vaughn Rush, the surgeon who performed first successful bone pinning
- Benjamin P. Sachs, James R. Doty Distinguished Professor and Chair
- Joseph F. Sackett, M.D., neuroradiologist and professor of radiology
- Andrew V. Schally, former faculty, Nobel Prize in Physiology or Medicine (1977), French Legion of Honor
- Luther Leonidas Terry, M.D., 1935, U.S. surgeon general (1961–1965)
- Lewis Thomas, former faculty (1948–1950), physician, researcher, and essayist
- E. M. Toler, physician and coroner who served in the Louisiana State Senate from East and West Feliciana parishes from 1944 to 1954; graduate of Vanderbilt University School of Medicine in 1900, studied surgery at Tulane in 1905 and 1906
- Paul Wehrle, physician who helped develop of methods to prevent and treat polio and smallpox
- Benjamin B. Weinstein, a gynecologist and pioneer in the study of Reproductive Medicine. He was a founding member and president (1953-54) of the American Society for Reproductive Medicine, and founding member of the Tulane Medical School History of Medicine Society
- Maxwell Wintrobe, M.D.; Ph.D., Tulane, 1929, faculty (1927–30), pioneer in hematology developing method for hematocrit and sedimentation rate measurement and Wintrobe indices (MCV, MCH, MCHC) while at Tulane. Rewriting Musser's chapter on Diseases of Blood for Tice Practice of Medicine subsequently becomes the basis for Wintrobe's Clinical Hematology textbook.
- Joseph Bavaria, M.D., FACS, FRCS; He attended Tulane University as an undergraduate and graduated (honors) with a degree in chemical engineering in 1979. During his years at Tulane's Medical School, Bavaria had an externship in cardiac and thoracic surgery in Cincinnati. He graduated from Tulane's Medical School and was awarded the "Gold Scalpel Award".

== Affiliations ==
- Tulane Medical Center
- University Medical Center New Orleans
- Ochsner Medical Center
- Veterans Affairs Medical Center
- Tulane School of Public Health and Tropical Medicine
