= David John Doukas =

American bioethicist (born 1957)

- Born: 4 November 1957 (age 68); Washington, D.C.
- Education: University of Virginia; Georgetown University
- Occupations: Physician and bioethicist

David John Doukas (born 4 November 1957, Washington, D.C.), is an American family physician and bioethicist. He is the professor emeritus in medical ethics and family medicine at Tulane University. He previously held the James A. Knight Chair of Humanities and Ethics in Medicine at Tulane (2017–2024) and was past director of the program in medical ethics and human values at Tulane University's School of Medicine. Doukas was also the past executive director of the Master of Science in Bioethics and Medical Humanities at Tulane University. Additionally, Doukas served as the health care chief ethics consultant at the Southeast Louisiana Veterans Health Care System in New Orleans as well as the VISN16 clinical ethics liaison from 2017 to 2024. Doukas was founding president of the Academy for Professionalism in Health Care (2012 to 2019), for which he was awarded the first Presidential Award at the Academy for Professionalism in Health Care Annual Meeting in June 2023, for his efforts as founder and president of APHC for seven years (2012–2019). In a 2023 analysis of the top 100 cited articles in ethics education, Doukas was "recognized as one of the most influential authors in the field of ethics education, with five articles in the top 10 list attributed to his name that have amassed a total of 296 citations." In 2026, Doukas was elected to Sigma Xi, the Scientific Research Honor Society.

== Early life ==
Doukas holds degrees in biology and religious studies (B.A.) from the University of Virginia and an M.D. from Georgetown University School of Medicine. After completing a family practice internship at UCLA and residency at the University of Kentucky, he completed a postdoctoral fellowship in bioethics (1986–87) at the Joseph and Rose Kennedy Institute of Ethics of Georgetown University.

== Career ==
He served on the faculties of Georgetown University (1987–1989), the University of Michigan (1989–1999), the University of Pennsylvania (1999–2004), and as the William Ray Moore Endowed Chair of Family Medicine and Medical Humanism, the director of the Division of Medical Humanism and Ethics, a professor in the Department of Family and Geriatric Medicine, and co-director of the Interdisciplinary Master of Arts in Bioethics Program at the University of Louisville (2004–2017). He joined the faculty of the Tulane University's School of Medicine in December 2017.

== Scholarship ==
His scholarship focuses on the areas of professionalism, primary care bioethics, genetics, and end-of-life care decision-making. He is the originator of the concept termed the family covenant (1991), a health care agreement between a health provider and an entire family that addresses issues revolving around individual and family claims to medical information. Doukas and others subsequently applied the family covenant to genetic and end-of-life ethical circumstances.

He is the co-developer and author of Values History (1988) with LB McCullough as a method for eliciting the values and advance directives of patients toward life-prolonging care. This instrument was subsequently translated from English to German allowing for dissemination of this advance directive instrument to be spread throughout Europe. He co-authored Planning for Uncertainty with William Reichel, M.D.. Cited as "provid[ing] useful background and practical steps," the book examines the evaluation of patient values and their relevance to advance directive selection. According to WorldCat, the book's two editions are held in 1031 libraries.
