= Alston Callahan =

- Born: March 16, 1911; Vicksburg, Mississippi
- Died: October 28, 2005 (aged 94); Birmingham, Alabama
- Burial place: Elmwood Cemetery (Birmingham, Alabama)
- Occupation: Ophthalmologist
- Years active: 1933-1997
- Known for: Reconstructive eye surgery

Alston Callahan (March 16, 1911 – October 28, 2005) was a prominent American medical doctor who practiced ophthalmology. A pioneer in the field of reconstructive eye surgery, he established the Eye Foundation Hospital in Birmingham, Alabama and also served as the first Chairman of the Ophthalmology Department at the University of Alabama School of Medicine.

== Personal life ==
Born in Vicksburg, Mississippi he attended Mississippi College in Clinton and graduated from the Tulane University School of Medicine in 1933 at the age of 22. After completing a residency in ophthalmology at Charity Hospital in New Orleans he returned to Vicksburg to open a private practice; in 1941 he married Eivor Holst (1913-2002) of San Francisco, the couple had 6 children and 10 grandchildren

== Career ==
Commissioned into the United States Army Medical Corps in 1942 he was assigned to the Northington General Hospital in Tuscaloosa, Alabama which was one of five military hospitals designated as Eye Centers, there he gained experience treating wounded service members who had suffered eye injuries. After discharge from the military in 1946 he started a new private practice in the city of Birmingham; in 1964 he helped establish the Ophthalmology Department at the University of Alabama Medical School (now part of the University of Alabama at Birmingham) and was named its first Chairman.

Recognizing a need for specialized eye care in the Birmingham area and throughout the state of Alabama in 1950 he began raising money for a dedicated facility, the Eye Foundation Hospital opened in 1964 funded entirely by private donations; in 1997 it became part of the UAB Hospital and in 1999 was renamed the Callahan Eye Hospital in his honor. The first center in the state totally dedicated to the care and treatment of the eye it currently handles over 23,000 patients and performs 10,000 surgical procedures each year as well as having the only 24 hour a day emergency eye treatment center in Alabama; it also serves as a training center for ophthalmology residents. Concerned with the ability of all citizens of the state to have access to eye care he established a fundraising partnership with the Alabama Lions Clubs that provided low cost or free eye care to those in need, during his lifetime Callahan personally raised more than $40 million for the cause of eye care and research.

After retiring from active practice at the age of 86 he helped found the International Retinal Research Foundation, a nonprofit public organization dedicated to conducting and funding research on eye diseases with an emphasis on the causes and treatment of Macular degeneration and Diabetic retinopathy; each year it provides millions of dollars in research grants and funds 3 post doctoral research fellowships.

A renowned traveler, Callahan lectured and participated in medical conferences throughout the United States and around the world eventually visiting 93 countries as well as the North and South Poles, his extensive collection of Asian art is now displayed in the Alston and Eivor Callahan Gallery of the Birmingham Museum of Art. During his medical career he wrote or coauthored 22 books and published 175 articles on ophthalmology. He was enshrined in the Alabama Academy of Honor, the Alabama Healthcare Hall of Fame and the Birmingham Gallery of Distinguished Citizens. UAB Hospital honored Callahan and his wife Eivor with an endowed Chair in Ophthalmology; in 1997 the Eye Foundation Hospital was renamed the UAB Callahan Eye Hospital.

== Sources ==
- Atkinson, William C., The Jolly Roger: An Airman's Tale of Survival in World War II. Indianapolis, Dog Ear Publishing ISBN 978-1-4575-3951-0
