= Rudolph Matas =

American physician

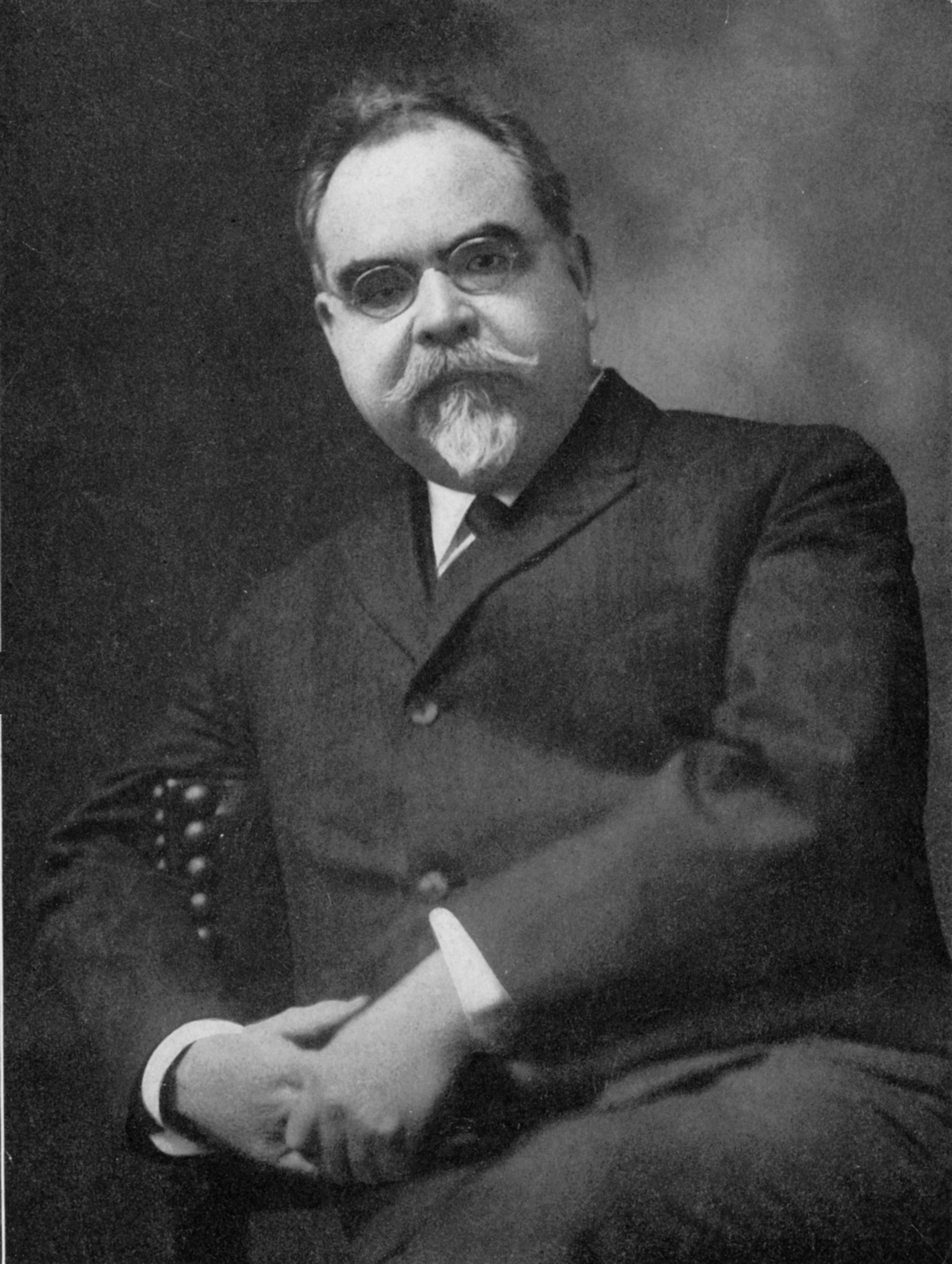
- Born: September 12, 1860; St. Charles Parish, Louisiana, U.S.
- Died: September 23, 1957 (aged 97); New Orleans, Louisiana, U.S.
- Education: Tulane University Medical School
- Scientific career
- Fields: Vascular surgery
- Workplaces: Tulane University

Rudolph Matas (September 12, 1860 – September 23, 1957) was an American surgeon. He was born outside New Orleans in St. Charles Parish, Louisiana, and spent much of his childhood in his parents' native land of Spain. Matas returned to New Orleans in 1877 to begin his medical training at the Medical School of the University of Louisiana, which is now known as Tulane University School of Medicine. He received his medical degree in 1880, at the age of 19.

Matas was the first to use spinal anesthesia as part of surgery in the United States, with work he conducted in 1889. He was the developer of the intravenous drip technique, of suction, of siphonage in abdominal operations, and the first to surgically repair aneurysms. Furthermore, he was the first to perform a Kondoleon operation for elephantiasis in the U.S. In 1896, he published an influential pamphlet, The Surgical Peculiarities of the American Negro.

Many of his publications continue to be cited through the 2000s. William Osler called him the "Father of Vascular Surgery." He was a founding member of the American Association for Thoracic Surgery, and a member of its first council in 1917, serving as its third President in 1919. During World War I, he led the United States School for War Fractures. The Rudolph Matas Award in vascular surgery was established in 2004 to recognize "a lifetime of excellence, achievement and contributions to the field of Vascular Surgery."

Matas directed the New Orleans Medical and Surgical Journal, actively supported the Charity Hospital, and worked as a Professor of Surgery at Tulane University. He was named by the Times-Picayune as one of the individuals that defined New Orleans in the 20th Century. The school's surgical interest group is named in his honor, the Rudolph Matas Surgical Society, as is the Rudolph Matas Health Sciences Library. Rudolph Matas Elementary School in Metairie, Louisiana is also named in his honor. The journal Science published at the time that "his colleagues have felt for many years that by consulting him they could extract more information from his encyclopedic mind than they could obtain from a visit to a library".

In Isidore Cohn's 1960 book, it was revealed that William Stewart Halsted had operated on Matas for "a mass" in 1903. The story of Matas' "secret operation" circulated in New Orleans for many years. Upon Matas's death, the autopsy revealed the right testicle had been removed surgically many years ago. Matas died in New Orleans on September 23, 1957, at the age of 97.

== Bibliography ==
- AATS: Biography – Rudolph Matas. Accessed June 13, 2007.
- Southern History. Rudolph Matas Accessed June 13, 2007.
- Rudolph Matas, M.D. (1860–1957), papers (ca. 1860–1960), Manuscripts Collection 868, 55 feet (17 m). Correspondence, lectures, speeches, diaries, and other materials documenting Matas' career as physician, surgeon, teacher, and scientist. Located in the Tulane Manuscripts Department, Tulane University's Special Collections Division: .
- Rudolph Matas Bibliography compiled by staff members of the Rudolph Matas Library (PDF, 56MB)
