= John Neilson (colonel) =

Early American figure

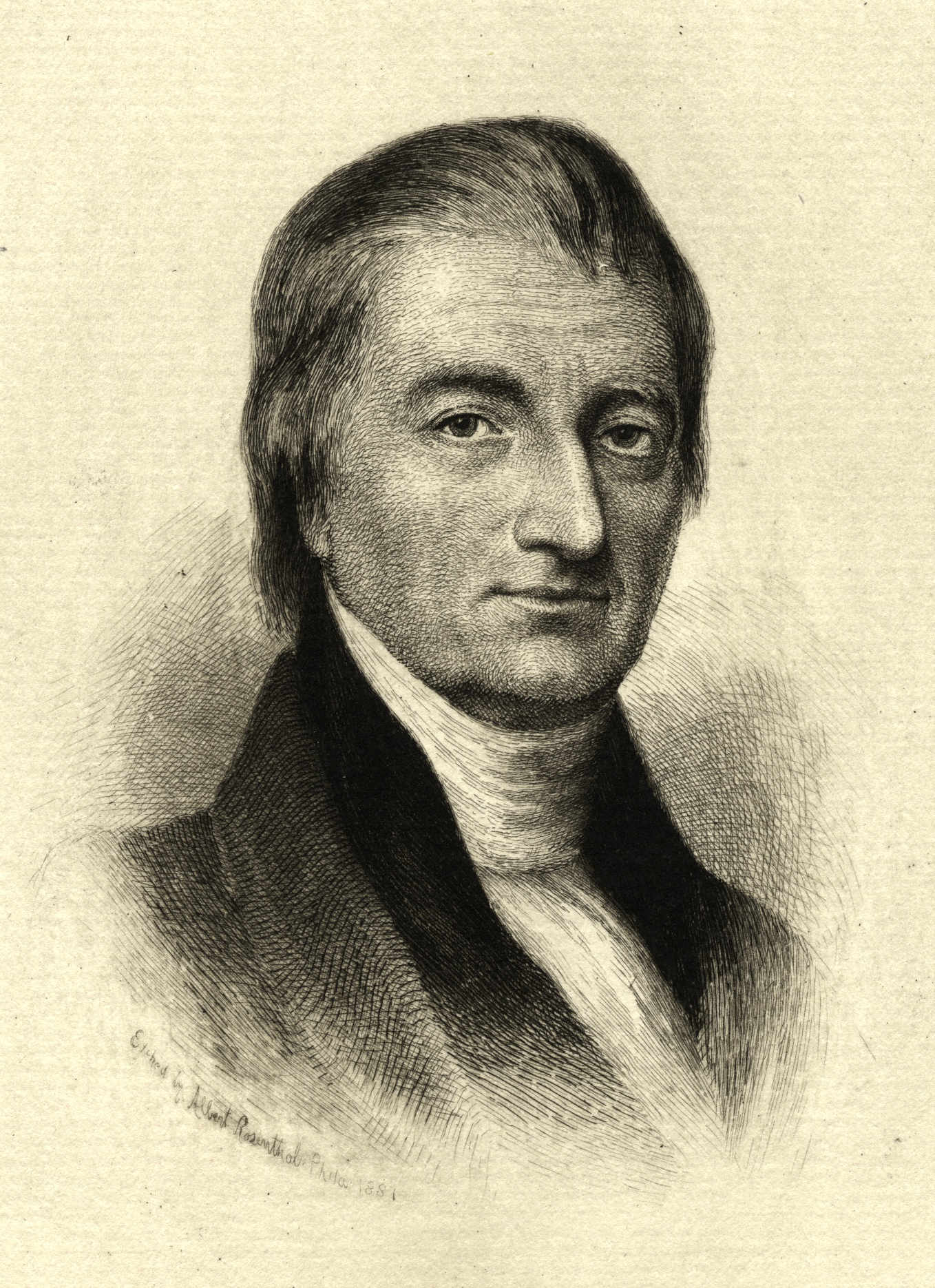
- Born: March 11, 1745; Raritan Landing
- Died: March 3, 1833; New Brunswick
- Education: University of Pennsylvania
- Occupations: Merchant, officer, politician
- Spouse: Catharine Schuyler Voorhees
- Children: 11
- Parents: John Neilson; Joanna Coeymans/Coejeman; James Neilson (adoptive father)

John Neilson (March 11, 1745 – March 3, 1833) commanded the New Jersey militia in the northern part of the state during the American Revolution, served in the New Jersey legislature during and after the Revolution, and was one of the earliest trustees of Rutgers University. He is also notable for one of the earliest public readings of the Declaration of Independence, which was recently immortalized in a statue located at Monument Square Park in New Brunswick.

== Early life and education ==
Neilson was born in Raritan Landing, New Jersey to Dr. John Neilson, an Irish physician who emigrated to the British America in 1740, and Joanna Coeymans, who was of Dutch ancestry.

Neilson's father died eight days after his birth and he was subsequently raised by his uncle James Neilson, a merchant. Neilson gained admission to the University of Pennsylvania in 1758, but did not complete his degree.

== Career ==
=== American Revolution ===
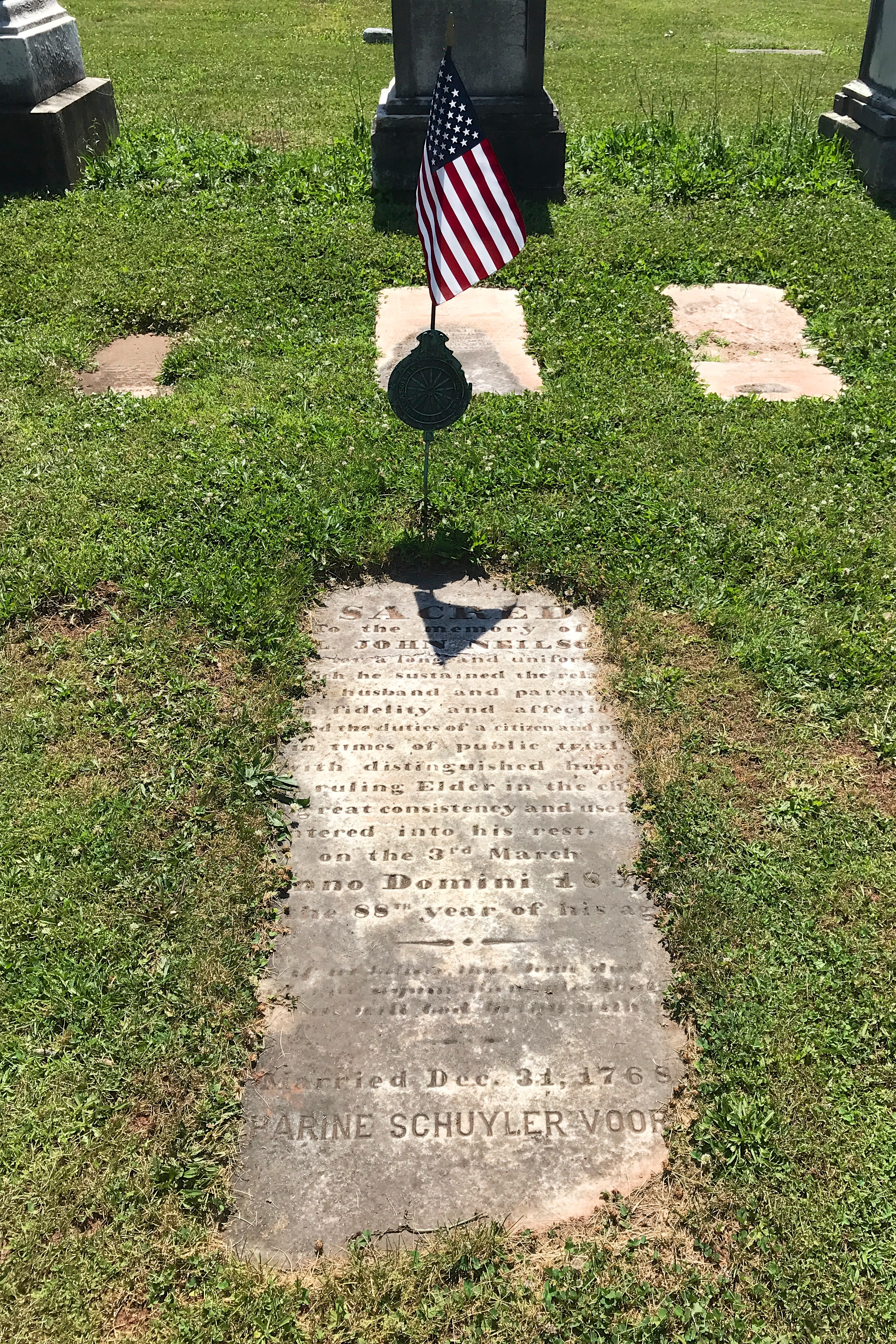
Neilson's gravestone at Van Liew Cemetery in North Brunswick, New Jersey

On July 9, 1776, Neilson stood on a table in front of the White Hall Tavern on Albany Street in New Brunswick, New Jersey, and read the Declaration of Independence aloud for the third official (and approved) time. The audience included Patriots supportive of American independence who cheered at the conclusion of the reading, though several Loyalists who opposed independence also were present. On July 9, 2017, a statue entitled The Third Reading of the Declaration of Independence depicting Neilson was unveiled at Monument Square Park in New Brunswick.

Prior to the Revolution, Neilson worked as a merchant in his uncle's shipping business in New Brunswick and in ownership of a salt mine in Toms River operated by Major John Van Emburgh.

At the beginning of the Revolution, Neilsen resented what he labeled "the attempt of a venal Parliament, bought by an oppressive minority, to tax his country." In 1775, he raised a militia and was active throughout the conflict. On August 31, 1775, Neilson was commissioned by the Provincial Congress of New Jersey and appointed Colonel of a battalion of Minutemen for Middlesex County. He achieved the rank of Brigadier General in February 1777 after achieving an early battle success.

One of Neilson's earliest engagements was at the Battle of Bennett Island on the Raritan River, which was key to the defense of New Brunswick, in early 1777. Leading the Second Regiment of the Middlesex militia, he and his force of 150 militiamen, with reinforcement from General Israel Putnam and 50 Pennsylvanian riflemen, used intelligence from a defector to attack a Loyalist regiment of the New Jersey Volunteers led by Major Richard Witham Stockton, a first cousin of Declaration signer Richard Stockton. With only losing one militiaman, Neilsen's forces successfully captured Major Stockton along with Captain Asher Dunham, Lieutenant Fraser, and 62 Loyalists. The officers were subsequently transferred under General Putnam's management, where Neilson was stationed 15 miles south at Princeton. Neilson's victory was noted by George Washington to Congress soon thereafter.

In 1778, Neilson was appointed as a delegate to the Second Continental Congress, but he chose not to serve. In 1779, Neilson represented Middlesex County in the New Jersey state legislature.

=== Slavery ===
John Neilson inherited several enslaved people from his uncle James Neilson. His involvement in slavery is documented in his family's archival collection at Special Collections and University Archives at Rutgers University as well as in government records for Middlesex County. At various times between the 1770s and the 1820s, he enslaved, bought, and sold at least 11 different Black people, including men, women, and children.

== Family ==
In 1768, Neilson married Catharine Schuyler Voorhees, a descendant of the Schuyler family. They had 11 children, six of whom survived past infancy:

- John Neilson (1775–1857), a doctor who married Abigail Bleecker, a daughter of Anthony Lispenard Bleecker. Their son was Henry A. Neilson
- Colonel James Neilson (1784–1862), who married four times
- Abraham Schuyler Neilson (1792–1861), who married Catherine Stevens Grant
- Joanna Neilson (1786–1858)
- Gertrude Neilson (1780–1862), who married Rev. George Spofford Woodhull

Michael Douglas (1944–), an American actor, is a descendant through his mother Diana Dill whose mother was Ruth Neilson
