= Cyril Y. Bowers =

American biochemist

Cyril Y. Bowers, M.D., emeritus professor of medicine at Tulane University School of Medicine, attended medical school at the University of Oregon and did an internship at the University of Washington. He then studied biochemistry at Cornell University and attended the postgraduate school of medicine at the University of Pennsylvania. From 1961-2004 he was the director of the Section of Endocrinology & Metabolism in the department of medicine at Tulane University School of Medicine. Bowers has served on the editorial board of several endocrine journals, was a member of the National Institute of Diabetes and Digestive and Kidney Diseases Study Section for eight years and has written over 400 articles in peer-reviewed journals, including chapters in books and over 200 abstracts.

== Research interests ==
Some noteworthy accomplishments include the development of TRH analogs, LHRH antagonists and the development of a new class of small synthetic peptides (GHRPs, growth hormone releasing peptides) that specifically release growth hormone in animals and humans. In 1969, the Van Meter Award was given to Drs. Bowers, Schally and Folkers for the isolation and identification of TRH. The work on TRH strongly supported that additional hypothalamic releasing hormones would be discovered which was accomplished within the next 2 years with the discovery of LHRH by Dr. Schally’s group and others followed in subsequent years. In 1998 he received the Monsanto Clinical Investigator Award from the Endocrine Society in recognition of his contribution in the field of hypothalamic hormones and his discovery of the GHRP pathway and its clinical and therapeutic importance.

Some of Dr. Bowers’ current and future objectives include development of 1) ghrelin receptor agonists for undernutrition, i.e., cancer, cachexia, starvation; 2) ghrelin receptor antagonists for overnutrition, i.e., obesity; 3) use of ghrelin agonists in diabetes; 4) use of ghrelin agonists to restore normal function of the GH-IGF-I axis in older men and women; 5) intranasal and long acting delivery systems for ghrelin agonists/antagonists, and to obtain licenses and funds for development of the ghrelin agonists/antagonists as well as for a completed Phase I LHRH antagonist.

== Selected publications ==
(Publications selected from over 450 peer-reviewed publications)

1. Mericq V, Cassorla F, Garcia H, Avila A, Bowers CY, Merriam G. Growth Hormone Responses to Growth Hormone Releasing Peptide (GHRP) and to Growth Hormone Releasing Hormone (GHRH) in Growth Hormone Deficient Children (GHD). J Clin Endocrinol Metab 1995; 80:1681-4.

2. Pihoker C, Middleton R, Reynolds GA, Bowers CY, Badger TM. Diagnostic Studies with Intravenous and Intranasal Growth Hormone Releasing Peptide-2 in Children of Short Stature. J Clin Endocrinol Metab 1995; 80:2987-92.

3. Van den Berghe G, de Zegher F, Veldhuis JD, Wouters P, Awouters M, Verbruggen W, Schetz M, Verwaest C, Lauwers P, Bouillon R, Bowers CY. The Somatotropic Axis in Critical Illness: Effect of Continuous GHRH and GHRP-2 Infusion. J Clin Endocrinol Metab 1997; 82:590-99.

4. Pihoker C, Badger TM, Reynolds, GA, Bowers CY. Treatment Effects of Intranasal Growth Hormone Releasing Peptide-2 in Children with Short Stature. J Endocrinol 1997; 155:79-86

5. Van den Berghe G, Veldhuis JD, de Zegher F, Wouters P, Bowers CY, Bouillon R. Growth Hormone Releasing Peptide 2 Infusion Synchronizes Growth Hormone, Thyrotropin and Prolactin Secretion in Prolonged Critical Illness. J Clin Endocrinol Metab 1997; 47:599-612.

6. Pihoker C, Kearns GL, French D, Bowers CY. Pharmacokinetics and Pharmacodynamics of Growth Hormone Releasing Peptide-2: A Phase I Study in Children J Clin Endocrinol Metab 1998; 83:1168-72.

7. Van den Berghe G, de Zegher F, Baxter RC, Veldhuis JD, Wouters P, Schetz M, Verwaest C, Van der Vorst E, Lauwers P, Bouillon R, Bowers CY. Neuroendocrinology of Prolonged Critical Illness: Effects of Exogenous Thyrotropin Releasing Hormone and Its Combination with Growth Hormone Secretagogues. J Clin Endocrinol Metab 1998; 83:309-19.

8. Bowers CY. Synergistic Release of GH by GHRP and GHRH: Scope and Implication. In B Bercu, R Walker (ed) Growth Hormone Secretagogues. Marcel Dekker, Inc New York, p. 1-25 1998.

9. Mericq V, Cassorla F, Salazar T, Avila A, Iniguez G, Bowers CY, Merriam GR. Effects of Eight Months Treatment with Graded Doses of a GH-Releasing Peptide in GH-Deficient Children. J Clin Endocrinol Metab 1998; 83:2355-2360

10. Bowers, CY. Growth Hormone Releasing Peptide (GHRP). Cell and Mol Life Sci 1998; 54(12):1316-29.

11. Van den Berghe G, Wouters P, Weekers F, Mohan S, Baxter RC, Veldhuis JD, Bowers CY, Bouillon R. Reactivation of Pituitary Hormone Release and Metabolic Improvement by Infusion of Growth Hormone Releasing Peptide and Thyrotropin Releasing Hormone in Patients with Protracted Critical Illness. J Clin Endocrinol Metab 1999; 84:2140-50.

12. Meacham LR, Culler FL, Abdul-Latif H, Sullivan KM, Bowers CY. Preservation of Growth Hormone Releasing Peptide-2 During Prednisone Therapy Metabolism 1999; 48(5):585-89.

13. Bowers CY. GH Releasing Peptides (GHRPs). In: Handbook of Physiology, Kostyo J, Goodman H, eds, Oxford University Press, New York, 1999; pg 267-297.

14. Bowers CY. GHRP Historical Perspective Basic and Clinical. In: Human Growth Hormone Basic and Clinical Research. Contemporary Endocrinology, eds R. Smith, M. Conn, Humana Press, New York, pg 17-43, 2000.

15. Bowers CY. Unnatural GHRP Begets Natural Ghrelin. J Clin Endocrinol Metab 2001; 86:1464-1469.

16. Gondo RG, Aguiar-Oliveira MH, Hayashida CY, Toledo S, Abelin N, Levine MA, Bowers CY, Souza A, Pereira R, Santos N, Salvatori R. Growth Hormone (GH) Releasing Peptide-2 Stimulates GH Secretion in GH Deficient Patients with Mutated GH-Releasing Hormone Receptor. J Clin Endocrinol Metab 2001; 86:3279-83.

17. Van den Berghe G, Baxter RC, Weekers F, Woeters P, Bowers CY, Iranmanesh A, Veldhuis JD, Bouillon R. The combined administration of GHRP-2, TRH and GnRH to men with prolonged critical illness evokes superior endocrine and metabolic effects compared to treatment with GHRP-2 alone. Clin Endo 2002; 56:655-669.

18. Tannenbaum GA, Epelbaum J, Bowers CY. Interaction between the Novel Peptide Ghrelin and Somatostatin/GHRH in Regulation of Pulsatile GH Secretion. Endocrinology 2003; 967-974.

19. Mericq V, Cassorla F, Bowers CY, Avila A, Gonen B, Merriam G. Changes in Appetite and Body Weight in Response to Long Term Oral Administration of the Ghrelin Agonist GHRP-2 in GH Deficient Children. J Pediatric Endocrinol Metab 2003; 16:981-985.

20. Bowers CY. Historical Milestones. In: Ghrelin, Ghigo E, ed, Klerwer Academic Publishers, Boston/London; 2004, pg 1-13.

21. Iranmanesh A, Bowers CY, Veldhuis JD. Activation of Somatostatin-Receptor Subtype (SSTR)-2/5 Suppresses the Mass, Frequency and Irregularity of GHRP-2 Growth Hormone Secretion in Men. J Clin Endocrinol Metab 2004; 89:4581-87.

22. Inui A, Asakawa A, Bowers CY, Mantovani G, Laviano A, Meguid M, Fujimiya M. Ghrelin, Appetite, and Growth-The Emerging Role of the Stomach as an Endocrine Organ. FASEB J 2004; 18:439-456.

23. Bowers CY, Granda-Ayala R, Mohan S, Kuipers J, Baylink D, Veldhuis JD. Sustained Elevation of Pulsatile GH Secretion and IGF-I, IGFBP-3 and IGFBP-5 Concentration during 30-Day Continuous Infusion of GHRP-2 in Older Men and Women. J Clin Endocrinol Metab 2004; 89:2290-2300.

24. Veldhuis JD, Roemmich JN, Richmond EJ, Rogol AD, Lovejoy JC, Sheffield-Moore M, Mauras N, Bowers CY. Endocrine Control of Body Composition in Infancy, Childhood, and Puberty. Endoc Rev 2005; 26:114-146.

25. Laferrere B, Abraham C, Russell CD, Bowers CY. Growth Hormone Releasing Peptide -2(GHRP-2), Like Ghrelin, Increases Food Intake in Healthy Men. J Clin Endocrinol Metab 2005; 90:611-614.

26. Veldhuis JD, Anderson SM, Iranmanesh A, Bowers CY. Testosterone Blunts Feedback Inhibition of Growth Hormone Secretion by Experimentally Elevated Insulin-like Growth Factor-1 Concentration. J Clin Endocrinol Metab 2005; 90:1613-1617.

27. Erickson D, Keenan DM, Farhy L, Mielke K, Bowers CY, Veldhuis JD. Determinants of Dual Secretagogue Drive of Burst Like Growth Hormone Secretion in Premenopausal Women Studied Under a Selective estradiol Clamp. J Clin Endocrinol Metab 2005; 90:1741-1751.

28. Soares-Welsh C, Farhy L, Mielke KL, Mahmud FH, Miles JL, Bowers CY, Veldhuis JD. Complementary Secretagogue Pairs Unmask Prominent Gender-related Contrasts in Mechanisms of Growth Hormone Pulse Renewal in Young Adults. J Clin Endocrinol Metab 2005; 90:2225-2232.

29. Veldhuis JD, Iranmanesh A Bowers CY. Joint Mechanisms of Impaired GH Pulse Renewal in Aging Men. J Clin Endocrinol Metab 2005; 90:4177-4183.

30. Bowers CY. Octanoyl Ghrelin is Hypothalamic Rooted. Endocrinology 2005; 146:2508-2509.

31. Veldhuis JD, Keenan DM, Mielke K, Miles JM, Bowers CY. Supraphysiological Testosterone Supplementation in Healthy Older Men Drives GH and IGF-I Secretion without Potentiating Peptidyl Secretagogue Efficacy. Eur J Endocrinol 2005; 153:1-10.

32. Fintini D, Alba M, Schally AV, Bowers CY, Parlow AF, Salvatori R. Effects of Combined Long Term Treatment with a Growth Hormone-Releasing Hormone Analogue and a Growth Hormone Secretagogue in the Growth Hormone Releasing Hormone Knock Out Mouse. Neuroendocrinology 2005; 82(3-4):198-207.

33. Veldhuis JD, Roemmich JN, Richmond EJ, Bowers CY. Somatotropic and Gonadotropic Axes Linkages in Infancy, Childhood and the Puberty-Adult Transition. Endocr Rev 2006; 27(2):101-40.

34. Bowers CY, Chang J-K, Wu S, Linse KD, Hurley DL, Veldhuis JD. Biochemistry of Growth Hormone Secretagogue Molecules, In: Fat Loss, Wasting and Cachexia in Medicine, (Ed:) Schuster, M. and Mantovani, G. Springer Verlag, Chapter 5.7, 2006. p 219-234.

35. Laferrere B, Hart AB, Bowers CY. Obese Subjects Respond to the Stimulatory Effect of the Ghrelin Analogue Growth Hormone Releasing Peptide-2 (GHRP-2) on Food Intake. Obesity 2006; 14(6):1056-63.

36. Veldhuis JD, Iranmanesh A, Mielke K, Miles JM, Carpenter PC, Bowers CY. Ghrelin Potentiates Growth Hormone Secretion Driven by Putative Somatostatin Withdrawal and Resists Inhibition by Human Corticotropin-Releasing Hormone. J Clin Endocrinol Metab 2006; 91(6)2441-6.

37. Veldhuis JD, Keenan DM, Iranmanesh A, Mielke K, Miles JM, Bowers CY. Estradiol Potentiates Ghrelin-Stimulated Pulsatile GH Secretion in Postmenopausal Women. J Clin Endocrinol Metab 2006; 91(9):3559-65.

38. Farhy LS, Bowers CY, Veldhuis JD. Model-Projected Mechanistic Bases for Sex Differences in Growth-Hormone (GH) Regulation in the Human. Am J Regul Integr Comp Physiol 2007; 292(4):R1577-93.

39. Veldhuis JD, Keenan DM, Bowers CY. Estimation of the Size and Shape of GH Secretory Burst in Healthy Women Using a Physiological Estradiol Clamp and Variable-Waveform Deconvolution Model. Am J Physiol Regul Integr Comp Physiol. 2007; 293(3):R1013-21.

40. Veldhuis JD, Keenan DM, Bowers CY. Peripheral Estrogen Receptor-Alpha Selectivity Modulates the Waveform of GH Secretory Burst in Healthy Women. Am J Physiol Regul Integr Comp Physiol. 2007; 293(4):R1514-21.

41. Iranmanesh A, Carpenter PC, Mielke K, Bowers CY, Veldhuis JD. Putative Somatostatin Suppression Potentiates ACTH Secretion Driven by Ghrelin and Human Corticotropin-Releasing Hormone. J Clin Endocrinol Metab 2007; 92(9):3653-9.

42. Veldhuis JD, Cosma M, Erickson D, Paulo R, Mielke K, Farhy LS, Bowers CY. Tripartite Control of Growth Hormone Secretion in Women during Controlled Estradiol Repletion. J Clin Endocrinol Metab 2007; 92:2336-2345

43. Bowers CY, Laferrere B, Hurley D, Veldhuis JD. The Role of GHS and Ghrelin in Feeding and Body Composition. Metabolism and Obesity, Research and Clinical Applications (Ed) Patricia A. Donohoue, MD, Humana Press, Totowa, New Jersey 2008, p. 125-154.

44. Bowers CY, Merriam GR, Veldhuis JD. Validation of Growth-Hormone-Releasing Peptide-2 for the Diagnosis of Adult Growth Hormone Deficiency. Nat Clin Pract Endocrinol Metab 2008; 4(2):68-9.

45. Cosma M, Bailey J, Miles JM, Bowers CY, Veldhuis JD. Pituitary and/or Peripheral Estrogen-Receptor Alpha ER{alpha}) Regulated FSH Secretion Whereas Non-pituitary/peripheral/ER {alpha} Pathways Direct GH and Prolactin Secretion in Postmenopausal Women. J Clin Endocrinol Metab 2007; 93(3):951-8.

46. Paulo RC, Cosma M, Soares-Welch C, Bailey JN, Mielke KL, Miles JM, Bowers CY, Veldhuis JD. Gonadal Status and Body-Mass Index Jointly Determine GHRH/GHRP Synergy in Healthy Men. J Clin Endocrinol Metab 2008; 93(3):944-50.

47. Perboni S, Bowers CY, Kojima S, Asakawa A, Inui A. Growth Hormone Releasing Peptide 2 Reverses Anorexia Associated with Chemotherapy with 5-Fluoruracil in Colon Cancer Cell-Bearing Mice. World J Gastroenterology 2008; 14(41): 6303-05.

48. Paulo RC, Cosma M, Soares-Welch C, Bailey JN, Mielke KL, Miles JM, Bowers CY, Veldhuis JD. Gonadal Status and Body Mass Index Jointly Determine Growth Hormone (GH) Releasing Hormone/GH-Releasing Peptide Synergy in Healthy Men. J Clin Endocrinol Metab 2008; 93(3):944-50.

49. Bowers CY, Merriam GR, Veldhuis JD. Validation of Growth Hormone-Releasing Peptide 2 for the Diagnosis of Adult Growth Hormone Deficiency. Nat Clin Pract Endocrinol Metab 2008; 4(2):68-9.

50. Veldhuis JD, Reynolds GA, Iranmanesh A, Bowers CY. Twenty-Four Hour Continuous Ghrelin Infusion Augments Physiologically Pulsatile Nycthemeral and Entropic (feedback-regulated) Modes of Growth Hormone Secretion. J Clin Endocrinol Metab 2008; 93(9):3597-603.

51. Kok P, Paulo R, Cosma M, Mielke KL, Miles JM, Bowers CY, Veldhuis, JD. Estrogen Supplementation Selectively Enhances Hypothalamo-Pituitary Sensitivity to Ghrelin in Postmenopausal Women. J Clin Endocrinol Metab 2008; 93(10):4020-6.

52. Paulo R, Brundage R, Cosma M, Mielke KL, Bowers CY, Veldhuis JD. Estrogen Elevates the Peak Overnight Production Rate of Acylated Ghrelin. J Clin Endocrinol Metab 2008; 93(11):4440-7.

53. Veldhuis JD, Cosma M, Soares-Welch C, Paulo R, Miles JM, Bowers, CY. Aromatase and 5 a-Reductase Inhibition during an Exogenous Testosterone Clamp Unveils Selective Sex-Steroid Modulation of Somatostatin and Growth Hormone Secretagogue Actions in Healthy Older Men. J Clin Endocrinol Metab 2009; [Epub ahead of print] PMID 19088159.
