= Arthur Gottlieb =

American immunologist (1937–1998)

- Born: Abraham Arthur Gottlieb; December 14, 1937; Haifa, Mandate Palestine
- Died: June 7, 1998 (aged 60); New Orleans, Louisiana
- Education: Columbia College; New York University School of Medicine
- Occupation: Immunolgoist
- Medical career
- Institutions: Harvard Medical School; Rutgers University; Tulane Medical School

Abraham Arthur Gottlieb (December 14, 1937 – June 7, 1998) was an American biologist and immunologist.

== Biography ==
Gottlieb was born in Haifa under the British Mandate on December 14, 1937, to an American mother and a British father, who was then deputy minister of agriculture under the British Mandate. He grew up with his mother who returned to New York when he was 13 months old. Gottlieb attended the Bronx High School of Science with the class of 1954. He entered Columbia College in 1953 under the early admission scholarship program by Ford Foundation. He was a coxswain for Columbia's rowing team and graduated from Columbia in 1957, phi beta kappa.

Gottlieb received his medical degree from New York University School of Medicine with the highest class standing and did his medical internship and residency at Peter Bent Brigham Hospital in Boston. He worked in the National Heart Institute while serving in the United States Public Health Service and became a faculty member at Harvard Medical School in 1968. He became a tenured professor at Rutgers University in 1972 before joining the faculty of Tulane Medical School in 1975 as chairman of the Department of Microbiology and Immunology and professor of Medicine for 23 years until his death in 1998.

Gottlieb's research has focused on the linkages between the neuroendocrine system and the immune system. He was also the founder and chief executive of Imreg Inc., a company he founded to search for new substances that bolster the human immune system. He was a fellow of the American College of Physicians and the American Academy of Microbiology.

In 1987, Gottlieb carried out tests on the body fluid and tissue samples of a deceased St. Louis teenager, showing that AIDS was present in the United States as early as 1969, a decade before the disease was believed to have existed in this country.

== Personal life ==
Gottlieb died on June 7, 1998, in New Orleans at age 60.
