= Andrew Kirkpatrick (lawyer) =

American judge (1756–1831)

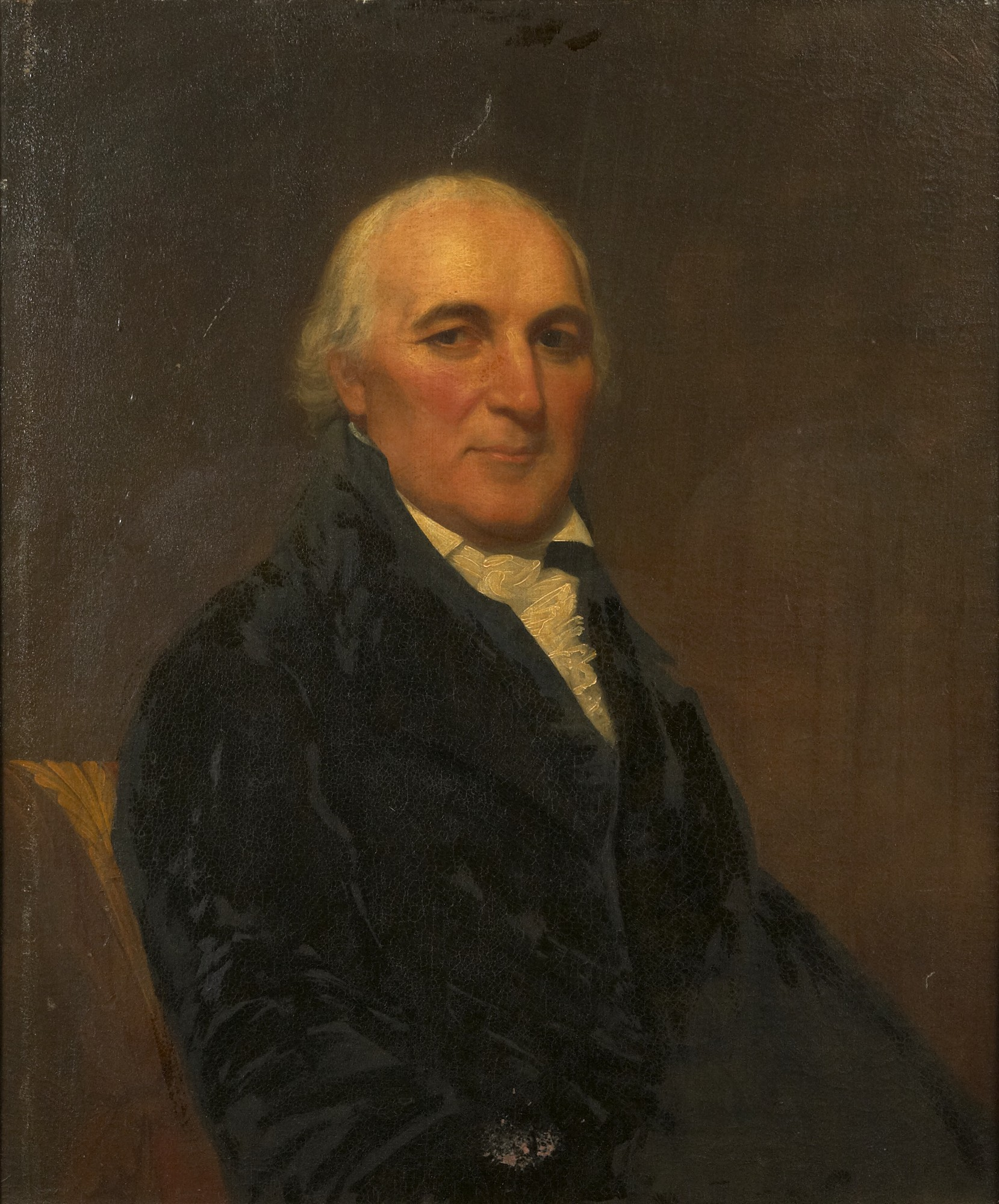

Justice of the New Jersey Supreme Court
- In office 1798–1825

Member of the New Jersey General Assembly
- In office 1797–1798

Personal details
- Born: February 17, 1756 Mine Brook, New Jersey
- Died: January 7, 1831 (aged 74) New Brunswick, New Jersey
- Spouse: Jane Bayard (m. 1792)
- Children: 4, including Littleton Kirkpatrick
- Education: College of New Jersey
- Occupation: Jurist, politician

Andrew Kirkpatrick (1756–1831) was an American lawyer, politician, and jurist from New Jersey.

== Biography ==
Andrew Kirkpatrick was born in Mine Brook, New Jersey on February 17, 1756. He graduated from the College of New Jersey (later Princeton University) in 1775.

He served one term as a member of the New Jersey General Assembly from 1797 to 1798. He was appointed to the New Jersey Supreme Court in 1798. In 1799, Kirkpatrick was governor Richard Howell's sole opponent in the state assembly for reelection; he was defeated 33 to 15. In 1804, he became the chief justice of that Court, and remained so until 1825.

For many years Kirkpatrick was a trustee of the College of New Jersey, and trustee of Queen's College (now Rutgers) from 1792 to 1809. He also served as a vice-president of the American Bible Society. He died on January 7, 1831, at New Brunswick, New Jersey.

== Marriage and family ==
Kirpatrick married Jane Bayard in 1792, and they had four children. Their son Littleton Kirkpatrick also became an attorney and politician, serving in Congress and as mayor of New Brunswick, New Jersey.

His namesake grandson, Andrew Kirkpatrick became an attorney and a United States District Court judge.

== Sources ==
- The Political Graveyard
