= List of museums in New Orleans =

This list of museums in New Orleans, Louisiana contains museums which are defined for this context as institutions (including nonprofit organizations, government entities, and private businesses) that collect and care for objects of cultural, artistic, scientific, or historical interest and make their collections or related exhibits available for public viewing. Museums that exist only in cyberspace (i.e., virtual museums) are not included. Also included are non-profit and university art galleries.

== Museums ==
Name	Neighborhood	Type	Summary
1850 House	French Quarter	Historic house	Part of the Louisiana State Museum, 1850s middle class period home
Algiers Folk Art Zone & Blues Museum	Algiers Point	Art	website, includes outdoor mixed-media statuary, poured concrete sculptural forms, and a small museum housing music memorabilia and works by noted self-taught artists
American Italian Museum	Central Business District	Ethnic	History of Italian Americans in the Southeast and their contributions, operated by the American Italian Cultural Center
Ansel M. Stroud, Jr. Military History and Weapons Museum	Lower Ninth Ward	Military	Official museum of the Louisiana National Guard located in the Jackson Barracks Complex, formerly known as the Jackson Barracks Military Museum
Audubon Butterfly Garden and Insectarium	French Quarter	Natural history	Insect information and live insects
Backstreet Cultural Museum	Tremé	African American	Cultural traditions and institutions of African-American culture in New Orleans, in particular Mardi Gras Indians, Jazz Funerals and Social Aid & Pleasure Clubs
Beauregard-Keyes House	French Quarter	Historic house	1860s period home with collection of antique dolls and tea pots
The Cabildo	French Quarter	History	Operated by the Louisiana State Museum, site of the Louisiana Purchase transfer ceremonies in 1803, exhibits on the history and culture of Louisiana and its ethnic groups
Confederate Memorial Hall Museum	Central Business District	Military	History and artifacts from the Confederate States of America and the American Civil War
Contemporary Arts Center	Central Business District	Art	Multi-disciplinary contemporary and performing arts center
Degas House	Tremé	Historic house	website, house where artist Edgar Degas resided and worked from 1872 to 1873
Fort Pike State Historic Site	Lake St. Catherine	Fort	Currently closed, decommissioned 19th-century United States fort
Diboll Art Gallery	Audubon	Art	website, part of Loyola University New Orleans, also known as the Collins C. Diboll Art Gallery and Visual Arts Center
Faerie Playhouse	Tremé	Historic house and LGBTQ history museum	
Gallier House	French Quarter	Historic house	1850s period house
Germaine Cazenave Wells Mardi Gras Museum at Arnaud's	French Quarter	Amusement	Part of Arnaud's restaurant, collection of Carnival court gowns, costumes and other memorabilia
Hermann-Grima House	French Quarter	Historic house	1830-1860s period Creole house
Historic New Orleans Collection	French Quarter	Multiple	Includes museum with exhibits about the history and culture of New Orleans and the Gulf South region, and the 1940-1950s period Williams Residence
House of Broel	Garden District	Historic house	website, Victorian-period house, open for tours by appointment, features a dollhouse museum
House of Dance and Feathers	Lower Ninth Ward	Culture	website, artwork, history, and culture of the Mardi Gras Indians, local Social Aid and Pleasure, Skull & Bones Gangs, and Baby Dolls
Irish Cultural Museum of New Orleans	French Quarter	Ethnic	website, history of the Irish in the city
Jean Lafitte National Historical Park and Preserve	French Quarter	Culture	French Quarter Visitor Center, history and traditions of the city and the delta region
Longue Vue House and Gardens	Lakewood	Historic house	20th century estate and gardens
Louisiana Children's Museum	City Park	Children's	website
Louisiana State Museum	French Quarter	Multiple	Operates The Cabildo, New Orleans Mint, The Presbytère, 1850 House and Madame John's Legacy
Lower Ninth Ward Living Museum	Lower Ninth Ward	Local history	website, history of the Lower 9th Ward through oral histories and exhibits
LSU New Orleans Art Galleries		Art	website, UNO St. Claude Gallery and UNO Lakefront Campus Fine Arts Gallery
Madame John's Legacy	French Quarter	Historic house	Operated by the Louisiana State Museum, late 18th century Colonial home
Mardi Gras World	St. Thomas Development	Amusement	Mardi Gras floats
McKenna Museum of African American Art	Central City	Art	website, exhibits of African Diasporan fine art
Le Musée de f.p.c.	Tremé	Historic house	website, mid 19th-century house with a focus on free people of color living in New Orleans
Museum of Death	French Quarter	History	website, includes body bags, coffins, skulls, antique mortician apparatuses, crime photos
Museum of the American Cocktail	Central City	Food	Part of the Southern Food & Beverage Museum, features history of mixed drinks and bartending memorabilia
National Seelos Shrine	St. Thomas Development	Religious	Shrine and museum about Francis Xavier Seelos, part of St. Mary's Assumption Church
National WWII Museum	Central Business District	Military	Formerly the National D-Day Museum. Focuses on the United States' contribution to victory in World War II and the Battle of Normandy website
New Canal Lighthouse Museum and Education Center	Lakeshore/Lake Vista	Maritime	Operated by the Lake Pontchartrain Basin Foundation, reconstructed lighthouse and museum
New Orleans African American Museum	Tremé	African American	African American art, history and culture
New Orleans Historic Voodoo Museum	French Quarter	Religious	History and folklore of rituals, zombies, gris-gris, Voodoo Queens
New Orleans Fire Department Museum	Garden District	Firefighting	Located in the Washington Avenue firehouse, open by appointment
New Orleans Mint	French Quarter	Numismatic	Part of the Louisiana State Museum, features a jazz museum and music venue that is part of the New Orleans Jazz National Historical Park
New Orleans Museum of Art	City Park	Art	Collections include French and American art, photography, glass, and African and Japanese works, Besthoff Sculpture Garden
New Orleans Pharmacy Museum	French Quarter	Medical	website, includes 19th-century pharmacy and medical artifacts, a 19th-century physician's study, a spectacle collection, homeopathic remedies, dental instruments and medical memorabilia
Newcomb Art Museum	Carrollton	Art	Part of the Woldenberg Art Center at Tulane University, decorative arts collection of crafts produced at Newcomb College from the late 19th through the early 20th century
Ogden Museum of Southern Art	Central Business District	Art	Visual arts and culture of the American South
Old Ursuline Convent	French Quarter	Religious	18th century convent
Pitot House	Faubourg St. John	Historic house	Early 19th century period house
The Presbytère	French Quarter	Historic Site	Part of the Louisiana State Museum, features changing exhibits of New Orleans history and culture
Southern Food and Beverage Museum	Central City	Food	Exhibits include The Museum of the American Cocktail, food and traditions of Louisiana, sugar, TV food pioneer Lena Richards, Acadian history and culture, fishing and natural history of the Gulf of Mexico, corn, community cookbooks

== Defunct museums ==
- Musée Conti Wax Museum, closed in 2016
- New Orleans Jazz Museum, since 2015, the collection is now on display at the New Orleans Mint

== See also ==
- List of museums in Louisiana
- Aquarium of the Americas
- Audubon Nature Institute
- Audubon Zoo
