= Bayou St. John submarine =

Submarine built for the Confederate States Navy

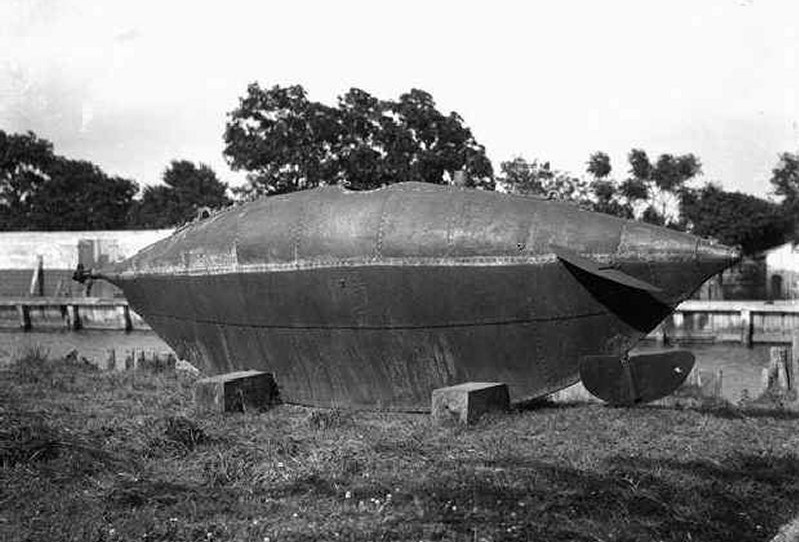
- The submarine on display beside Bayou St. John, 1890s

History

CSA
- Fate: Scuttled, c. April 25, 1862
- Status: Museum ship

General characteristics
- Type: Submarine
- Length: 20 ft (6.1 m)
- Beam: 3 ft (0.91 m)
- Height: 6 ft (1.8 m)
- Propulsion: Hand-cranked propeller
- Armament: Spar torpedo (presumed)

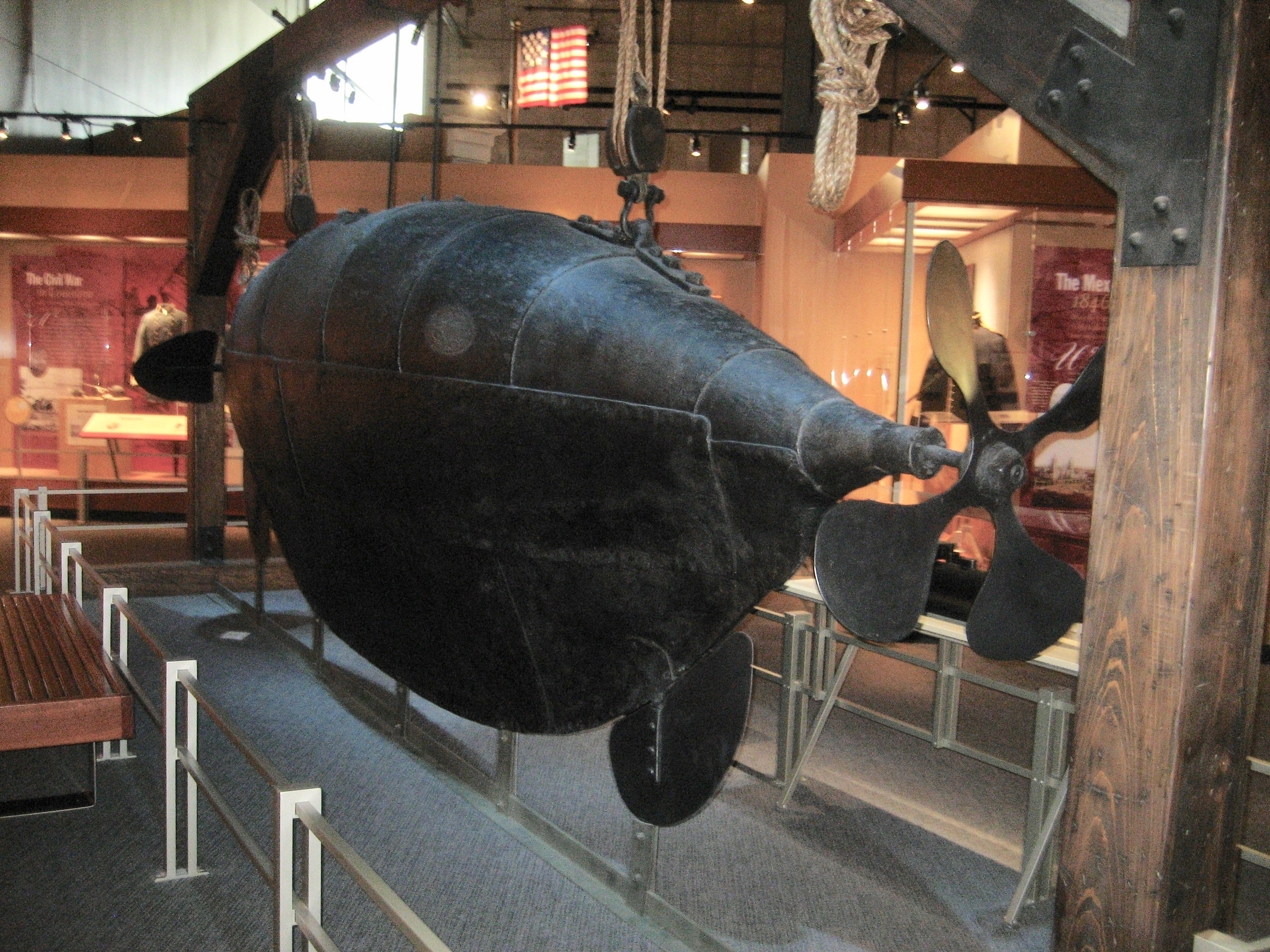
On display at the Louisiana State Museum, Baton Rouge, 2008

The Bayou St. John Confederate Submarine is an early military submarine built for use by the Confederate States of America during the American Civil War.

== Description ==
The submarine is constructed of riveted iron, 20 feet (6.1 m) long, 3 feet (0.91 m) wide and 6 feet (1.8 m) deep, with a hand-cranked propeller.

== History ==
No period documentation for the submarine is known to exist, and its original name and many details about it remain unknown. The submarine was rediscovered in 1878 during the dredging of Bayou St. John where it joins Lake Pontchartrain in New Orleans, Louisiana, where the submarine was presumably scuttled to prevent it falling into Union hands after the capture of New Orleans. It was put on display beside the Bayou at Spanish Fort Amusement Park as a curiosity, incorrectly identified as the Confederate submarine Pioneer.

The traditional identification as the Pioneer was not questioned seriously until historical research in the late 20th century showed the Pioneer to be of a different design than the one retrieved from Bayou St. John. The Bayou submarine and the Pioneer may have undergone trials at about the same time, and confusion of the two may date back to contemporary accounts; it is not clear which one was constructed first.

In 1908 the submarine was moved to the grounds of Camp Nicholls Confederate Home on Moss Street, beside Bayou St. John. At some point probably in the 1930s the interior of the submarine was filled with concrete in an attempt at preservation that later generations of conservators found questionable.

In 1942 the submarine was acquired by the Louisiana State Museum and moved to Jackson Square. After being in various displays around the Square it was placed in the shelter of the arcade on the ground floor of the Presbytere in 1957, where remained until 1998.

The submarine was then transported to Baton Rouge, where the old concrete was removed as part of restoration efforts. Afterwards, it was placed on display at the Capitol Park Museum - Baton Rouge.

== See also ==
- New Orleans in the American Civil War
