= Louisiana Historical Society =

Historical society in Louisiana

Louisiana Historical Society, established in 1835, is a historical society in Louisiana charged with documentation and protection of colonial records. According to its website, it is the oldest historical organization in the state.

The society has a long history of publishings, including the Louisiana Historical Quarterly. Physical items from their collection are frequently displayed at The Cabildo, whose preservation the Society was involved with. Among the items in their collection are a souvenir program marking the centennial of the Louisiana Purchase, a Napoleon death mask made by his personal physician Francesco Antommarchi, and items related to the centennial of steam service on the Mississippi River.

Alcée Fortier served as the society's president from 1894 to 1912.

== See also ==
- List of historical societies in Louisiana
