= The Arsenal (New Orleans) =

Coordinates: 29.95776°N 90.06409°W

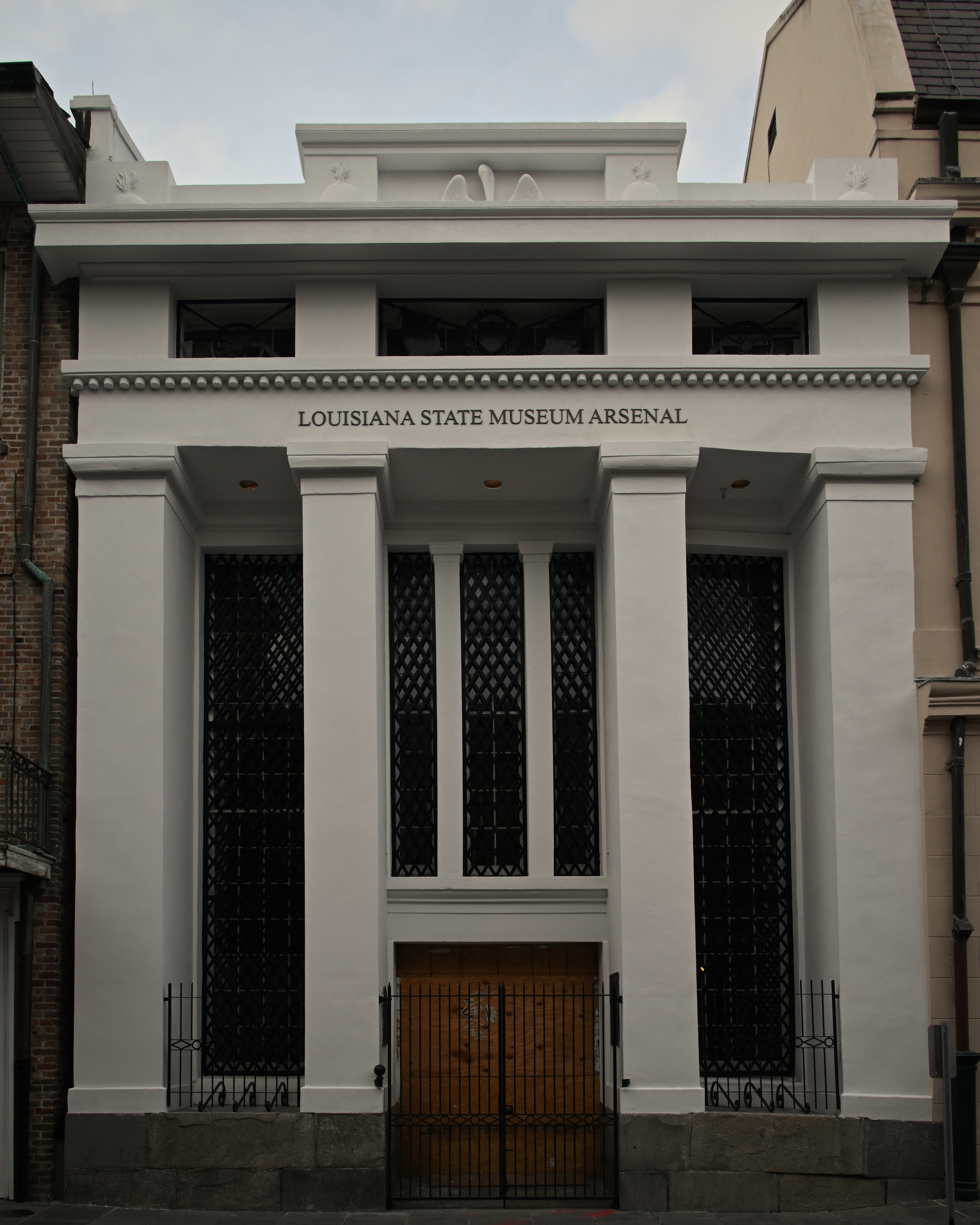
The Arsenal in 2025

The Old Louisiana State Armory, commonly referred to as the Arsenal, faces St. Peter Street in the French Quarter only a few yards from historic Jackson Square in New Orleans, Louisiana. Since 1914 it has served as a Louisiana State Museum site; it is open to the public via the adjacent Cabildo museum.

== History ==
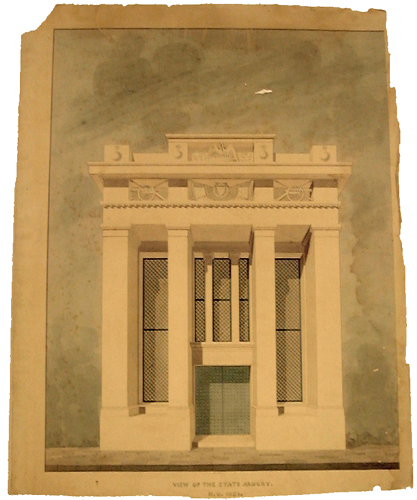
A front view of the Arsenal in 1839

Built in 1839, the Arsenal stands adjacent to the Cabildo on the site of the old Spanish Arsenal built in 1762 and the site of the old civil prison (the calaboose).

Designed by James H. Dakin, the building is an example of Greek Revival style. It housed the Orleans Artillery up until the American Civil War, when it was used by Confederate troops to store supplies. After occupation by Union forces, the Arsenal came under Federal control and was used as a military prison.

During Reconstruction, the building was turned over to the state and was used to house the New Orleans Metropolitan Police, giving it an important role in the Battle of Liberty Place in 1874. Violence between the pro-integration Metropolitan Police and the white supremacist Crescent City White League erupted over a contentious gubernatorial election. The White League prevailed at first, occupying the Cabildo and Arsenal for three days — until President Ulysses S. Grant sent in Federal troops to restore order.

In 1914, the Arsenal was transferred to the Louisiana State Museum to exhibit military objects.

== Museum ==
Although the Arsenal faces St. Peter Street, it is only accessible via the adjacent Cabildo museum.

Even though the structure once served as an arsenal or armory, there is generally nothing on display inside which is related to this history. The second floor houses changing exhibits that are open to the public.

The first floor serves as an education classroom for visiting school groups, while the third floor serves as meeting space.

== See also ==
- The Cabildo
- Louisiana State Museum
