= Charles Gillam =

Charles Gillam may refer to:

- Charles W. Gillam (1861–1933), member of the Minnesota Senate
- Charles Gillam Sr. (born 1945), American self-taught woodcarver and mixed-media artist
