= North Louisiana Historical Association =

The North Louisiana Historical Association was organized in 1952 to in its own words "encourage an appreciation and understanding of the history of North Louisiana."

== History ==
The association was organized in 1952 by D. H. Perkins and A. W. Shaw in a meeting held at Centenary College in Shreveport, Louisiana. Another founding member was W. Darrell Overdyke, a Centenary history professor known for his specialization on antebellum homes and the Know Nothing political party in the American South. The organization awards the Overdyke Awards in memory of Overdyke for the best research paper published by the journal. The organization publishes North Louisiana History to "encourage an appreciation and understanding of the history of North Louisiana." One of the officers of the corporation is the editor, whose duties include soliciting articles for inclusion in the journal and editing those articles for clarity and accuracy. NLHA designated the Noel Memorial Library at Louisiana State University in Shreveport as its records repository.

== See also ==
- North Louisiana
  - Louisiana Sports Hall of Fame & Northwest Louisiana History Museum – Natchitoches
- Central Louisiana – partly included in N.L.H.A.'s coverage area, according to the icon on their website
  - Louisiana History Museum – Alexandria
- List of historical societies in Louisiana
