= Charles Gillam Sr. =

American sculptor (born 1945)

Charles Gillam Sr. (born 1945) is an American self-taught woodcarver and mixed-media artist from New Orleans. He is the founder and director of the Algiers Folk Art Zone & Blues Museum in New Orleans.

== Biography ==
Charles Gillam Sr. was born in 1945 in rural Louisiana, and raised in the Ninth Ward neighborhood of New Orleans. He learned to paint by watching street artists in the French Quarter where he shined shoes with his brother. He received his first commission from the House of Blues who hired him to create a wood bust of the notable blues musician Charley Patton, the "father of Delta Blues". Since that point onward, every House of Blues in the United States has one of his carvings. In 2000, Gillam, along with folk artist Dr. Charles Smith, founded the Algiers Folk Art Zone & Blues Museum. The Algiers Folk Art Zone & Blues Museum is a community-based art collective that features regional folk art and teaches the importance of recycling to children. Every November, the Museum hosts an annual Folk Art Festival which raises funds for self-taught artists and celebrates New Orleans food, music, and art.

== Artworks ==
Gillam is mostly inspired by the culture of his hometown. His primary subject matter is New Orleans's culture, jazz and blues artists. He often uses driftwood found in the Mississippi River for his sculptures. He has created over 100 busts of famous jazz musicians including portraits of Louis Armstrong and Aaron Neville. Gillam also creates art using found objects; he turns them into portraits of blues men, paintings, and carved heads of New Orleans musicians.

=== "Ain't That a Shame" ===
"Ain't That a Shame" is an acrylic painting on wood featuring Fats Domino playing piano on the roof of his flooded studio. The small 24"x14" work was created in 2005 and is held by the Smithsonian National Museum of African American History and Culture.

== Collections ==
His work is held in the permanent collections of the Smithsonian National Museum of African American History and Culture and the National Blues Museum.
