= Elisabeth Real =

Elisabeth Real (circa 1700 – 1777), was a New Orleans businesswoman. She managed the merchant company of her second husband by proxy during his absences and in her own name after 1740, in addition to running a successful boarding house. She was one of the first European settler women in the French colony of Louisiana, and the real figure behind the famous Madame John's Legacy in the French Quarter.

== Life ==
Elisabeth Real belonged to the very first group of French women who were deported to Louisiana to become wives of the first male settlers during the epoch of John Law (economist) (1718–1720). She was around twenty years of age, illiterate and from Oléron in Bordeaux.

She married the settler captain Jean Pascal, who was given the land in New Orleans where the house Madame John's Legacy was built. When her spouse was killed in the Natchez massacre in 1729, she married François Marin. Both her husband's where shipowning traders, and unofficially traded in smuggled goods, which was common in the merchant elite of New Orleans at the time. Her second spouse was officially listed as innkeeper, and the inn was located in the house Madame John's Legacy, built on the land she inherited from her first husband. The inn was in practice managed by Elisabeth Real with a power of attorney from her husband, which was common for the New Orleans merchants like her spouse, who sailed along the Mississippi River or the Caribbean with their boats, being absent long periods of time. Her inn included a recreational garden in the French style, a gambling parlour as well as storage, which made it popular among travelling merchants.

When she was widowed for a second time in 1740, she did not remarry but continued to manage the business as a merchant and innkeeper in her own name. She was a respected and successful member of New Orleans's society as a significant actor in the city's commercial life. She remained illiterate, but had her business documents written for her, and she is known for her two wills (1769 and 1771). She socialized with the members of the colonial government, her daughter married into the elite and she was able to finance her son's education in France. She became an ancestor of several of the later families of the Creole aristocracy. Her inventory listed several luxury items such as Chinese porcelain, silver ornaments and silk.
