= Capitol Park Museum - Baton Rouge =

Museum in Baton Rouge, Louisiana, US

Coordinates: 30.4539°N 91.18634°W

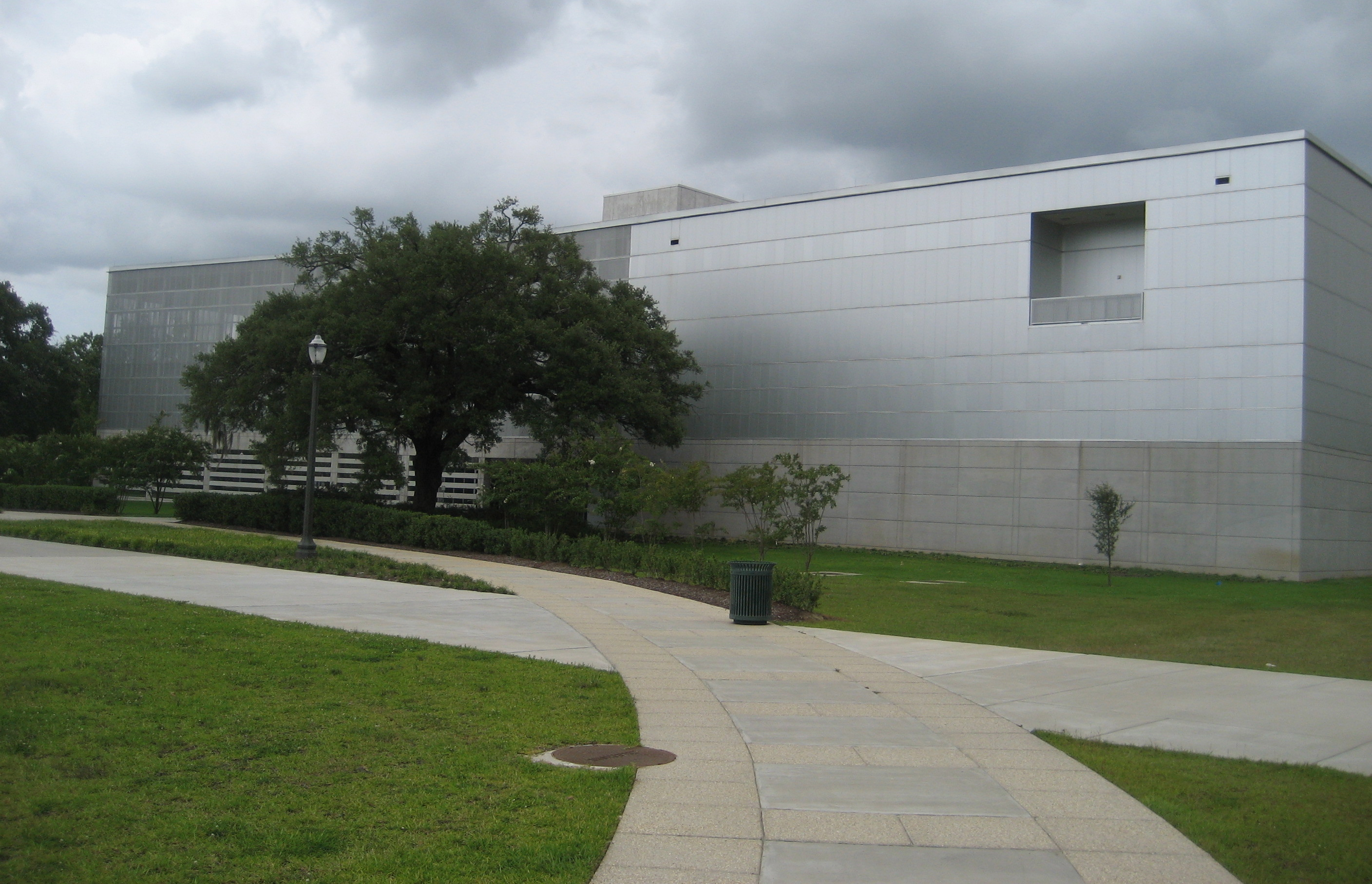
Exterior view, 2009

The Capitol Park Museum is a branch of the Louisiana State Museum located at 660 N. 4th Street, Baton Rouge, Louisiana.

There are two permanent exhibits on the history and culture of Louisiana. The building was designed by New Orleans–based design studio Eskew Dumez Ripple and exhibits were created by Christopher Chadbourne & Associates.

Notable objects include the Bayou St. John submarine and Louis Armstrong's childhood bugle.
