= 1850 House =

Museum in Louisiana, United States

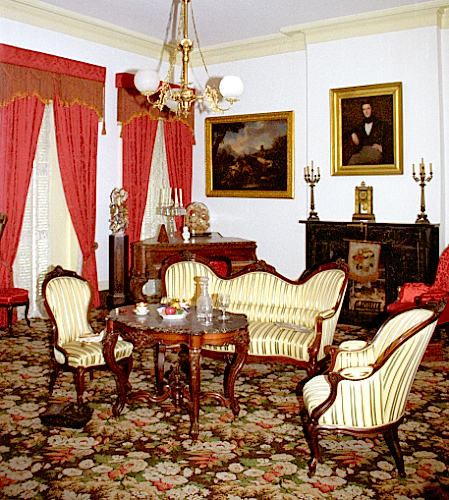
- Furniture on display
- Established: 1850
- Location: New Orleans
- Coordinates: 29.959584°N 90.062999°W
- Type: Antebellum row house
- Architect: James Gallier, Sr.
- Website: Louisiana State Museum 1850 House official website

The Louisiana State Museum's 1850 House is an antebellum row house furnished to represent life in mid-nineteenth-century New Orleans. It is located at 523 St. Ann Street on Jackson Square in the French Quarter.

== History ==
The Upper and Lower Pontalba Buildings, which line the St. Ann and St. Peter Street sides of Jackson Square, were built in 1850 by Micaela Almonester, Baroness de Pontalba, the daughter of Don Andres Almonaster y Rojas, the Spanish colonial landowner appointed to the Cabildo for life, and who built the Cathedral and Presbytere. Inspired by the imposing Parisian architecture the Baroness favored, the distinctive row houses were intended to serve as both elegant residences and fine retail establishments. In 1921 the Pontalba family sold the Lower Pontalba Building to philanthropist William Ratcliff Irby who subsequently, in 1927, bequeathed it to the State Museum.

Baroness Pontalba engaged noted local architect James Gallier, Sr. to design the row houses, though she dismissed him before construction was begun, and she employed Samuel Stewart as the builder. She also convinced authorities to renovate the Square, Cabildo and Presbytere, and church authorities to enlarge the Cathedral. When the Pontalba buildings were completed in 1849 and 1851, each contained sixteen separate houses on the upper floors and self-contained shops on the ground floors. The "A and P" monograms that decorate the cast-iron railings signify the Almonaster and Pontalba families.

During the mid-19th century, the first floor of the Pontalba buildings housed businesses, including dry goods stores, clothing stores, law offices and even a bank and railroad company. Upstairs are the parlor, dining room and three bedrooms. The house also comprises a back wing (called the "kitchen building" in the builder's contract), which served a variety of purposes, including storage, additional workspace and housing for slaves or servants.

== Residents ==
City directories from the 1850s and the 1860 census show that many Pontalba heads of household were merchants who were affluent enough to afford to rent in one of New Orleans's most fashionable locations. Children, slaves and servants completed the Pontalba household. An average of nine residents occupied each dwelling.

Families who rented #8 St. Ann:

- Members of the Soria family were merchants who came to New Orleans from New York to take advantage of the vast economic opportunities here. Like the majority of Pontalba residents, the Sorias were slave owners, their slaves numbering between five and eight.
- Widow Amelia Zacharie Saul Cammack lived in the house with her son, Thomas Dixon Cammack, and three of her four daughters, Gertrude, Kate and Amelia. The family owned between three and seven slaves during their Pontalba residency. The arrangement of the living quarters roughly corresponds to the way the Cammacks lived from 1853 to 1856.
- William G. Hewes moved here in 1856 with his two daughters, Caroline and Anna, and five slaves. Hewes was president both of a bank and of the New Orleans, Opelousas and Great Western Railroad.

== Museum ==
The Louisiana State Museum took possession of the building in 1927 and opened the 1850 House to the public in 1948. To illustrate the landmark's historical significance, the State Museum has re-created what one of the residences would have looked like during the Antebellum era when the Baroness Pontalba first opened her doors. Faithfully furnished with domestic goods, decorative arts and art of the period, the 1850 House depicts middle-class family life during the most prosperous period in New Orleans' history. Limited docent- and curator-led tours are available as is self-directed viewing.

Because residents of this row house were tenants who lived here for a few years at a time, the 1850 House does not represent any single family. Rather it reflects mid-nineteenth-century prosperity, taste, and daily life in New Orleans. Some pieces have a history of ownership in Louisiana, while local furniture shops made or sold others. The house comprises several revival styles that were popular in the 1850s, including rococo revival, Gothic revival, and classical revival.

Highlights:

- Old Paris porcelain
- New Orleans silver
- A six-piece bedroom suite, comprising a large half-tester bed, a duchesse or dressing table, two mirror-faced armoires, a washstand and a nightstand. Attributed to the warerooms of Prudent Mallard and made for Mrs. Magin Puig of 624 Royal.
- Other furnishings by William McCracken, J & JW Meeks, Sèvres, Bennington, and Cornelius & Baker
- Paintings by French-trained artists Jacques Amans, Jean Joseph Vaudechamp, Aimable Desire Lansot, François Bernard, who came to New Orleans in the early to mid 19th century.

== 1850 House Museum Store ==
The Friends of the Cabildo operates the 1850 House Museum Store, the official gift shop for the Louisiana State Museum properties in New Orleans. The 1850 House Museum Store is located on Jackson Square in the historic Lower Pontalba Buildings. In addition to membership and fundraising endeavors, the Friends of the Cabildo is able to provide financial support to the Louisiana State Museum through the sales of daily French Quarter Walking Tours and merchandise at the 1850 House Museum Store. At the store one can find handmade art, jewelry, pottery and crafts by local artists, books on everything from history to food to voodoo, and exhibit-related merchandise from Louisiana State Museum properties. French Quarter walking tours are also available (which also includes free admission to the 1850 House Museum). The houses were smaller at that time.
