= Louisiana Historical Association =

Academic organization in New Orleans, Louisiana

The Louisiana Historical Association is an organization established in 1889 in Louisiana to collect and preserve the history of Louisiana and its archives.

The organization was formed, in part, for the operation of New Orleans' Memorial Hall, which was donated to them on January 8, 1891.

Their journal, the Louisiana History: The Journal of the Louisiana Historical Association has been published since 1960.

== See also ==
- List of historical societies in Louisiana
