= Louisiana Sports Hall of Fame & Northwest Louisiana History Museum – Natchitoches =

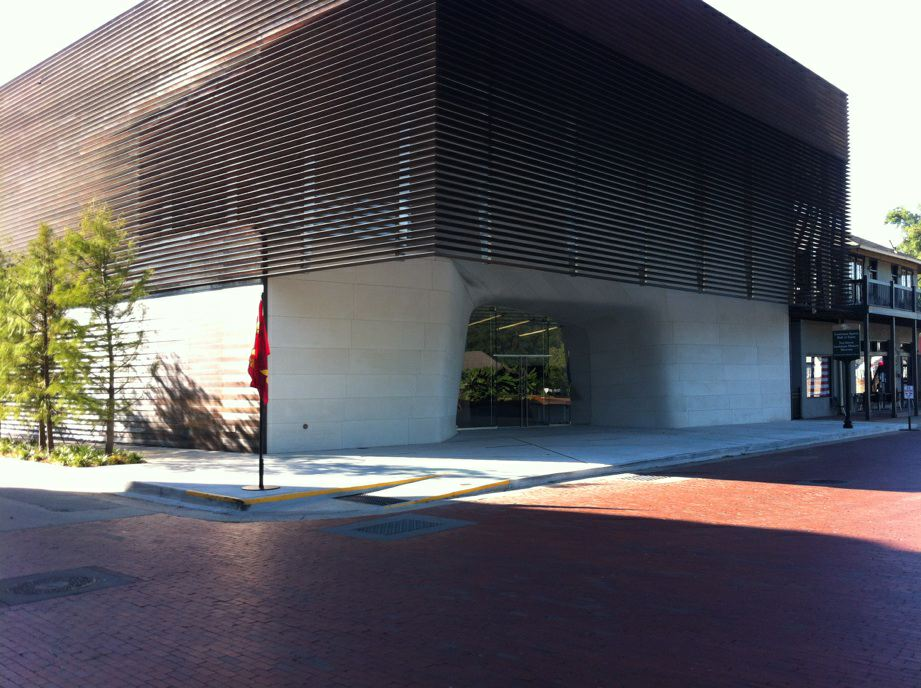
Louisiana Sports Hall of Fame & Northwestern Louisiana History Museum in Natchitoches, LA

The Louisiana Sports Hall of Fame & Northwest Louisiana History Museum, located in Natchitoches, Louisiana, is a branch of the Louisiana State Museum.

The Louisiana Sports Hall of Fame is dedicated to the history of sports in Louisiana, including the achievements of over 300 Louisiana athletes, coaches and other sports figures.

The Northwest Louisiana History Museum examines the area's cultural traditions and history from early native-American civilizations to the present.

The museum opened in 2013 in a new facility located on Cane River Lake. Built for $23 million, the building was designed by the firm of Trahan Architects of New Orleans and features sinuous molded stone interiors and earth-colored exterior sheathing in order to evoke the river.

== History ==
The Louisiana Sports Hall of Fame was first founded by the Louisiana Sports Writers Association in 1958, but it did not have a physical structure until the city Natchitoches and Northwestern State University addressed the issue in 1971 with an offer of space on the campus. The growing archive of memorabilia was shelved in Prather Coliseum for 40 years until the opening of the new $23 million Hall of Fame on June 28, 2013.

== See also ==
- North Louisiana Historical Association
