= List of historical societies in Louisiana =

The following is a list of historical societies in the state of Louisiana, United States.

== Organizations ==
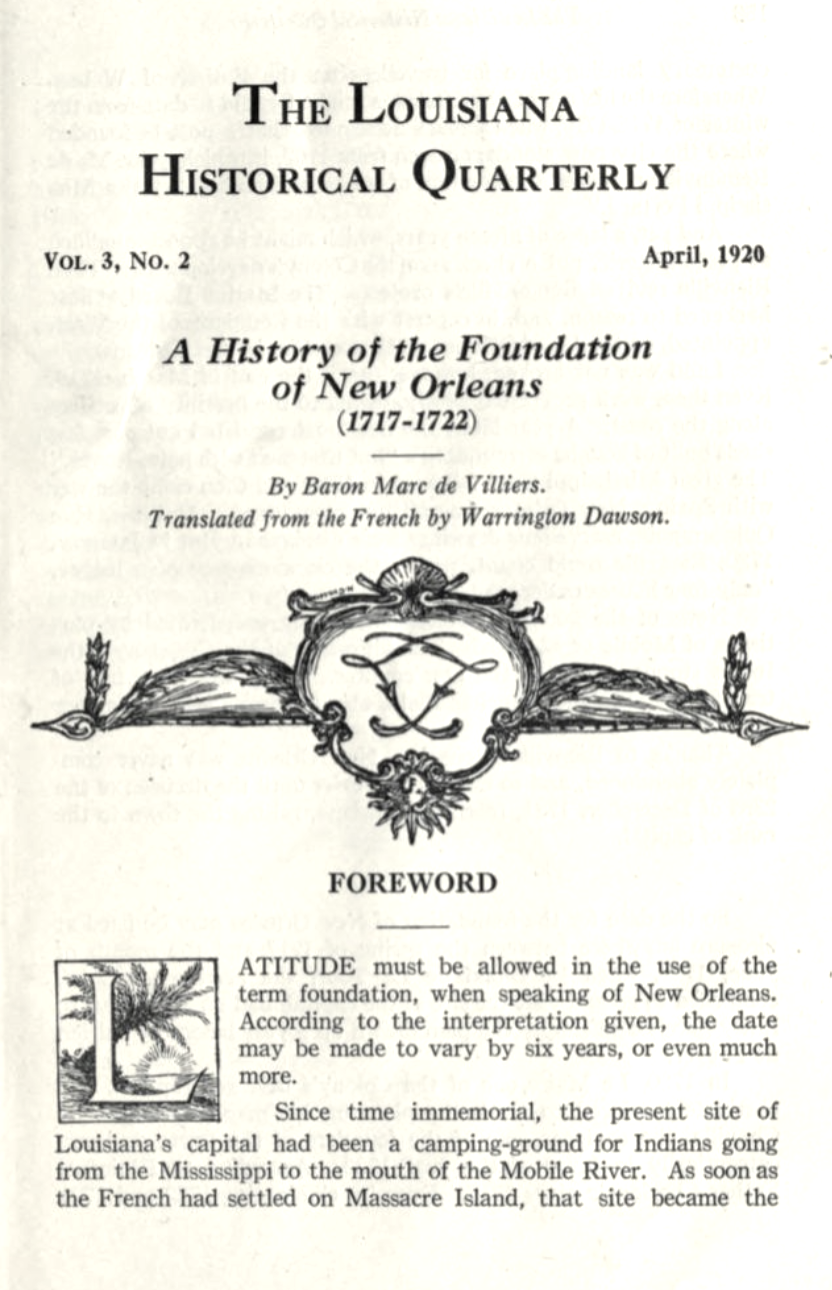
Louisiana Historical Quarterly, volume 3, number 2, April 1920

- Attakapas Historical Society
- Bossier Parish Historical Center
- Brimstone Historical Society (in Sulphur)
- Dorcheat Historical Association
- French Settlement Historical Society
- Gretna Historical Society
- Iberia African American Historical Society
- Jefferson Historical Society
- Lafourche Historical Society
- Lincoln Parish Museum & Historical Society
- Louisiana Historical Association
- Louisiana Historical Society (established in 1835)
- Madison Parish Historical Society
- Mount Lebanon Historical Society
- The Historic New Orleans Collection
- North Louisiana Historical Association
- Ouachita African American Historical Society
- Pointe Coupee Historical Society
- Preservation Resource Center of New Orleans
- Red River Crossroads Historical & Cultural Association
- River Road Historical Society
- St. Tammany Parish Historical Society
- Guardians of Slidell History
- Southeast Louisiana Historical Association
- Southwest Louisiana Historical Association
- Terrebonne Historical & Cultural Society
- West Baton Rouge Historical Association
- West Feliciana Historical Society
- Westwego Historical Society

== See also ==
- History of Louisiana
- List of museums in Louisiana
- National Register of Historic Places listings in Louisiana
- List of historical societies in the United States
