= North Louisiana History =

- Discipline: North Louisiana History
- Language: English

Publication details
- History: 1969–present
- Publisher: North Louisiana Historical Association (United States)
- Frequency: Biannually

Standard abbreviations
- ISO 4: North La. Hist.

Links
- Journal homepage

North Louisiana History is an academic journal published twice annually in Shreveport, Louisiana by the North Louisiana Historical Association (NLHA).

== History ==
The origin of North Louisiana History parallels the history of the NLHA itself, which was organized in 1952 at Methodist-affiliated Centenary College in Shreveport.

The NLHA founding members included Mrs. D. H. Perkins and Dr. A. W. Shaw. The organization awards the Overdyke Awards for its best published research paper in memory of W. Darrell Overdyke, a Centenary College history professor. With time, the associational publications became more formal, and the NLHA became a non-profit organization. The NLHA seeks to collect and preserve historical material about North Louisiana and under editorial review considers articles for publication from professional historians, lay historians, and students. According to the historian B. H. Gilley (1927-2017), formerly of the Louisiana Tech University faculty, "a wealth of research has been written and preserved in [the NLHA] publications".

=== North Louisiana Historical Association bulletin ===
A bulletin was edited from 1956 to 1958 by J. A. Manry (1903–1993). Manry was a journalist, regional scholar, and an historian. Other names for the Bulletin that might be found in citations are:

- Bulletin (North Louisiana Historical Association) (the uniform title)
- North Louisiana Historical Association Bulletin
- Bulletin of the North Louisiana Historical Association
- The Bulletin
- Bulletin

=== North Louisiana Historical Association news letter ===
From 1959 to 1969, NLHA published a newsletter. The editor was Max Bradbury, who with the Bradbury Award is still recognized annually for the "most outstanding article" published in North Louisiana History. Names for the newsletter that might be cited are:

- Newsletter (North Louisiana Historical Association) (this is the uniform title)
- North Louisiana Historical Association Newsletter
- North Louisiana Historical Association news letter
- Newsletter

=== Journal of the North Louisiana Historical Association ===
Beginning in the Fall of 1969, Morgan D. Peoples of Ruston, then a member of the Louisiana Tech History Department, became the editor and founded the journal. Under the original title, Journal of the North Louisiana Historical Association, the journal was published quarterly from 1969 through 1998. This journal is cited under a number of similar titles:

- Journal (North Louisiana Historical Association) (the uniform title)
- Journal of the North Louisiana Historical Association
- North Louisiana Historical Association journal
- Journal / North La. Hist. Assoc
- J North La Hist Assoc
- Journal
- Journal - North Louisiana Historical Association

=== North Louisiana History ===
Ending with Volume 29, No. 4 (Fall 1998) and beginning with Volume 30, No. 1 (Winter 1999), the journal was retitled North Louisiana History.

== Today ==
The publication is currently edited by Wesley Harris, historian at the Claiborne Parish Library and president of the Board of Directors of the Lincoln Parish Museum & Historical Society. In April 2024, he succeeded Kathleen Smith, a retired English professor at Louisiana State University in Shreveport. The printing press for the journal is named in honor of the late Louisiana Tech professor and regional historian John Ardis Cawthon.

The journal accepts articles for possible publication which focus on any part of Louisiana north of and including Alexandria. An index of articles published between 1970 and 2005 is available online.

Louisiana State University in Shreveport (LSUS) supports the journal with office space and a dedicated library collection as part of the LSUS Archives and Special Collections at the Noel Memorial Library, including an online list of journal articles. As of 1970, and still today, Centenary College holds an archive of historical NLHA material. Starting in 1970, articles published in the journal have been abstracted and cited in America: History and Life, Historical Abstracts.

== Bibliography ==
- North Louisiana Historical Association. Shreveport Medical Society. & Medical History Club of Shreveport. (1986). History of medicine in North Louisiana: Symposium : Papers. North Louisiana Historical Association.
- "McGinty Frequent Contributor to North La. Historical Journal". Ruston Daily Leader. 1977-05-17. p. 8 – via NewspaperArchive.
- "Tech Authors Write In History Journal". Ruston Daily Leader. 1975-02-19. p. 7 – via NewspaperArchive.
