= Confederate Memorial Hall Museum =

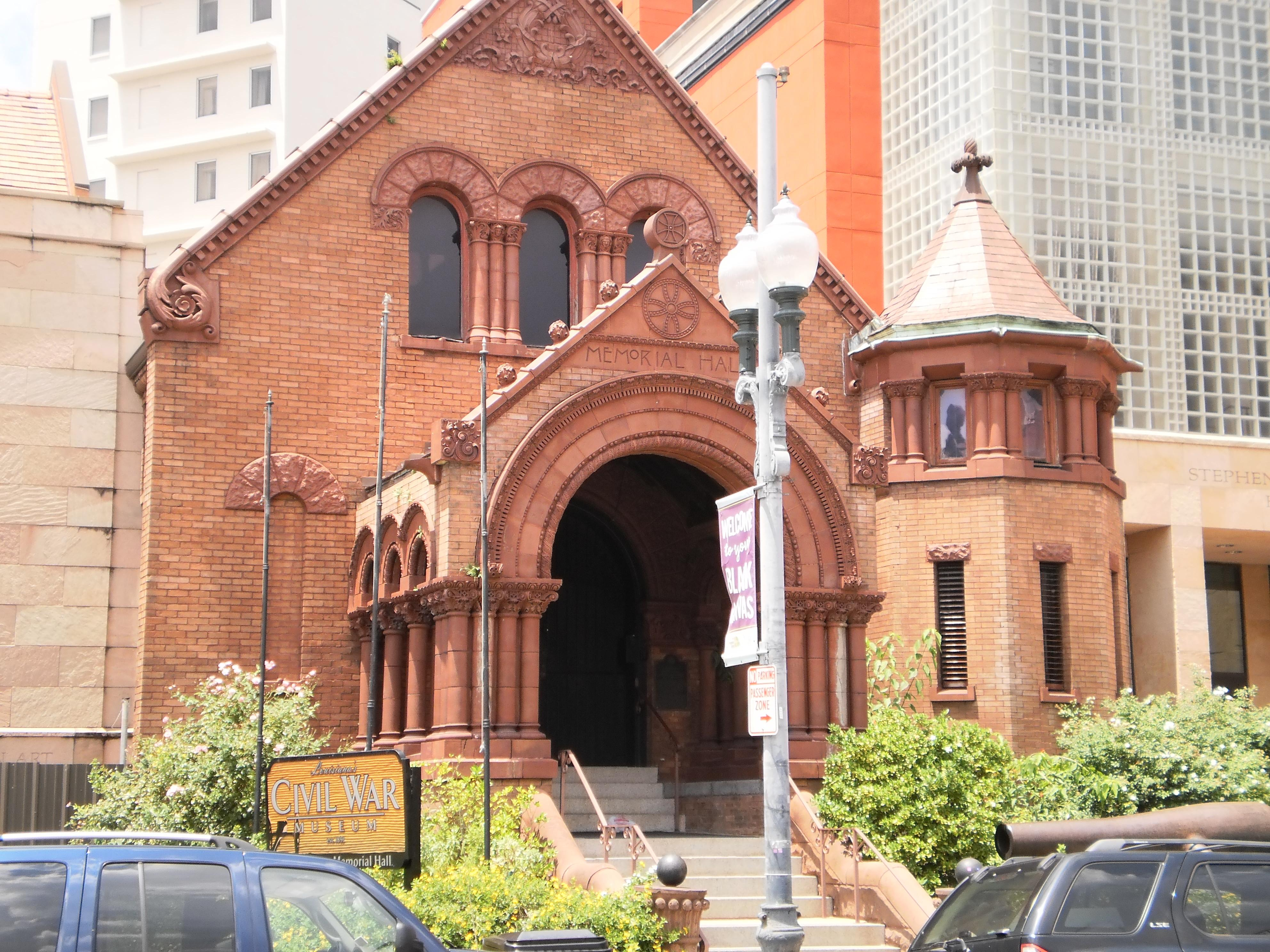
- Civil War museum in 2011

- Location within East New Orleans Location within Louisiana Location within the United States
- Established: 1891
- Location: 929 Camp St; New Orleans, Louisiana
- Coordinates: 29.943333°N 90.071389°W
- Type: War museum
- Website: confederatemuseum.com
- Confederate Memorial Hall
- U.S. National Register of Historic Places
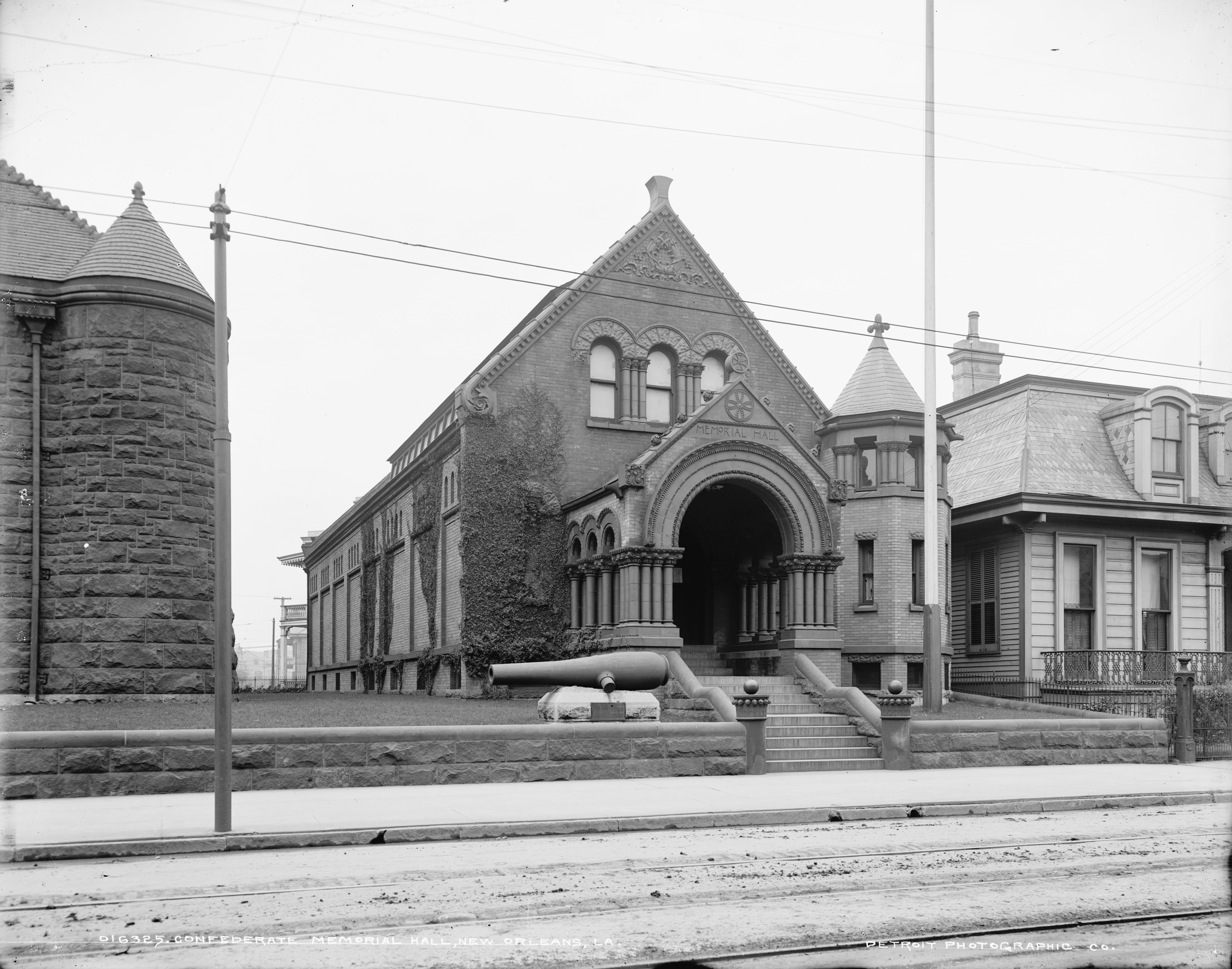
- Confederate Memorial Hall (circa 1900).
- Area: less than one acre
- Built: 1890
- Architect: Sully, Thomas O.
- Architectural style: Romanesque Revival, Richardsonian Romanesque
- NRHP reference No.: 75000852
- Added to NRHP: June 11, 1975

Confederate Memorial Hall Museum is a museum located in New Orleans which contains historical artifacts related to the Confederate States of America (C.S.A.) and the American Civil War. It is historically also known as "Memorial Hall". It houses the second-largest collection of Confederate Civil War items in the world, behind the American Civil War Museum in Richmond, Virginia. The museum has been advertised as Louisiana's Civil War Museum and as Louisiana's Oldest Museum.

This "Adjunct of the Howard Memorial Library Association", according to Frank T. Howard's letter of 8 Jan. 1891, was placed in the "possession" the Board of Governors of the Louisiana Historical Association "to be set apart forever for the use of" that organization. Sully & Toledano designed the hall, which was completed in 1888, following the Richardsonian Romanesque style of the Howard Library designed by H.H. Richardson.

== Collections ==
The Confederate Memorial Hall contains over 5,000 historical artifacts including several rare Civil War items. It holds the personal effects and uniforms of Confederate generals Braxton Bragg and P.G.T. Beauregard, as well as over 140 regimental and other C.S.A. flags. Jefferson Davis' wife Varina Davis donated several of her late husband's belongings to the museum including items of clothing, his Bible and saddle, plus a crown of thorns from Pope Pius IX.

== 19th-century history ==
Confederate Memorial Hall was established in 1891 by New Orleans philanthropist Frank T. Howard, to house the historical collections of the Louisiana Historical Association. The museum quickly accumulated a vast collection of Civil War items, mostly in the form of personal donations by veterans.

On 29 May 1893, the exhumed body of Confederate President Jefferson Davis was mourned by over 60,000 people as it lay in state in the hall, before being moved to his final resting place in Hollywood Cemetery (Richmond, Virginia).

== Ownership dispute ==
For much of its existence the Confederate Memorial Hall's building has been the subject of an ownership dispute that has involved numerous court battles and the involvement of several Louisiana political figures including Governors Huey Long and Mike Foster. The dispute has revolved around Howard's original donation of the building to the Louisiana Historical Association, which read "It is with deep satisfaction that I perform the act of formally putting into your possession the Building, which, while it is an Adjunct of the Howard Memorial Library Association, is to be set apart forever for the use of your organization." In 1930 the adjoining Howard Library sought the museum's building space to store portions of their collection. Governor Long negotiated a compromise in which the museum permitted the library to store some of its books in their basement.

In the 1940s the Howard Library outgrew its facilities and relocated to Tulane University. Its building was sold shortly afterwards and, after transferring to several owners, was donated to the University of New Orleans in the early 1990s. The old Howard Library building and a nearby property neighboring the Confederate Memorial Hall were then converted into the Ogden Museum of Southern Art by UNO. The location of Memorial Hall in between the two Ogden buildings gave rise to the latest dispute over the property, as visitors to the Ogden museums would have to exit each building and travel outdoors around the Memorial Hall to reach the remainder of the collection. A solution was proposed in which a tunnel between the two buildings through the Memorial Hall basement would be constructed and a proposal was drafted by Confederate Memorial Hall, but UNO withdrew from the negotiations in 1998.

== 21st century ==
In 2000, Tulane University, having absorbed the Howard Library, sold its title to the Memorial Hall building to UNO, which it claimed to possess as the former owner of the Howard Library properties. In 2001 the UNO foundation announced its claims to the Confederate Memorial Hall building and initiated efforts to remove the museum from the premises. A series of court battles ensued in which title ownership to the property was granted to UNO, however efforts to evict the museum were stayed by the courts on bonds.

As the case proceeded through the appellate processes, Governor Mike Foster intervened in the dispute and assisted in the drafting of a compromise between UNO and the museum that would allow Confederate Memorial Hall to remain in its historic building. In August 2003, at Foster's direction, both parties agreed to drop pending lawsuits to the building in exchange for fulfillment of a compromise agreement. Per the agreement, UNO is required to cede its title claims to the Confederate Memorial Hall museum's land and building in exchange for the construction of a connecting tunnel through the basement as was proposed in the 1997 plan. The compromise is to be implemented in full within 10 years time, or upon the completion of the tunnel, depending upon which comes first.

In 2011, a Confederate Battle Flag from the 14th Louisiana Infantry Regiment, stolen from the museum in the 1980s by a volunteer, was recovered from a collector who reportedly purchased the flag in 2004 without knowing it had been stolen.
