= Madame John's Legacy =

- U.S. National Register of Historic Places
- U.S. National Historic Landmark
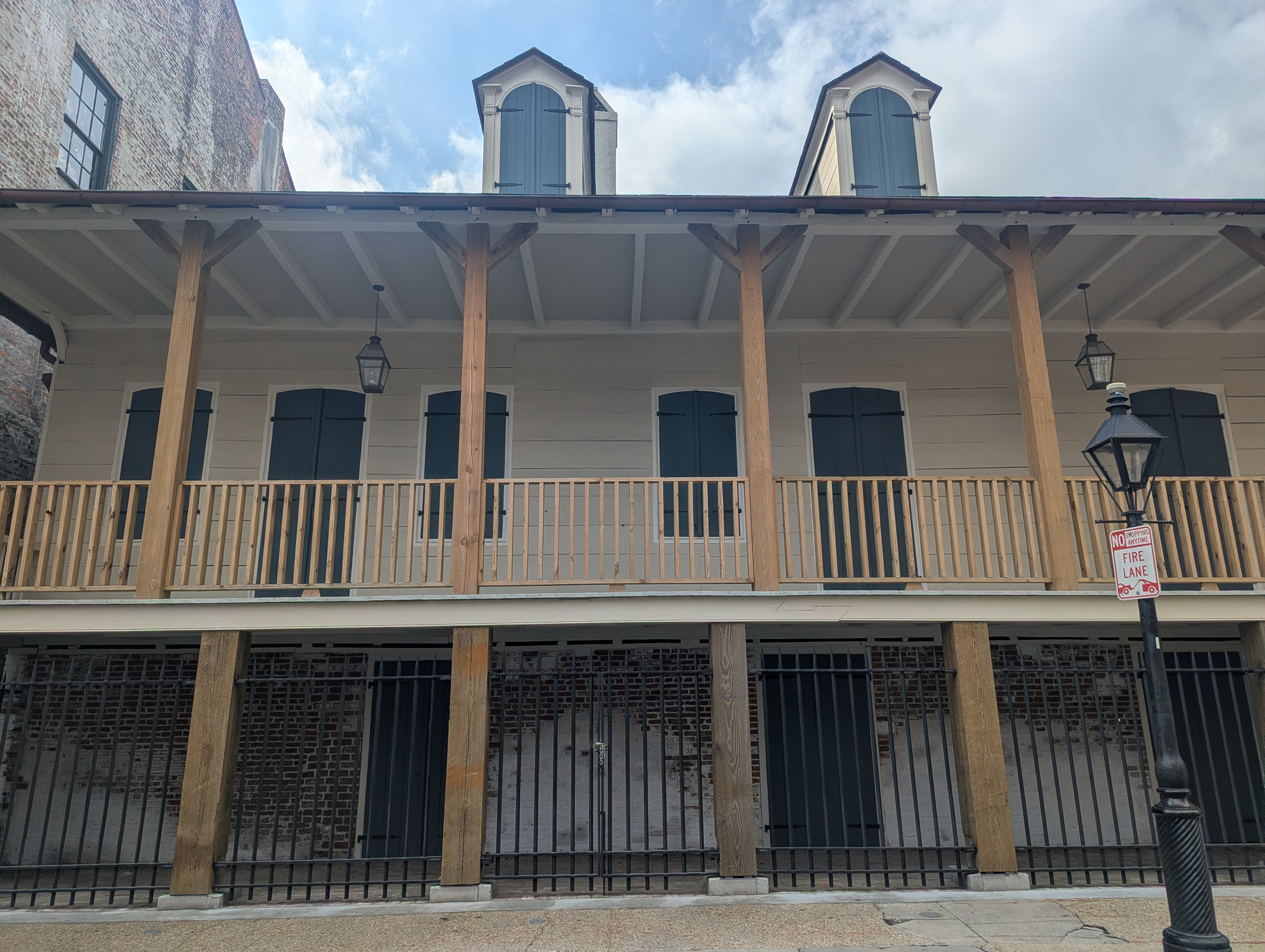

- Location within East New Orleans Location within Louisiana Location within the United States
- Location: 632 Dumaine St., New Orleans, Louisiana
- Coordinates: 29°57′31.76″N 90°3′46.5″W
- Built: 1788
- Architectural style: Colonial
- NRHP reference No.: 70000256

Significant dates
- Added to NRHP: April 15, 1970
- Designated NHL: April 15, 1970

Madame John's Legacy is a historic house museum at 632 Dumaine Street in the French Quarter of New Orleans, Louisiana. Completed in 1788, it is one of the oldest houses in the French Quarter, and was built in the older French colonial style that was still prevalent in New Orleans at that time. It was declared a National Historic Landmark in 1970 for its architectural significance. The Louisiana State Museum owns the house and provides tours. Admission is free.

== Description ==
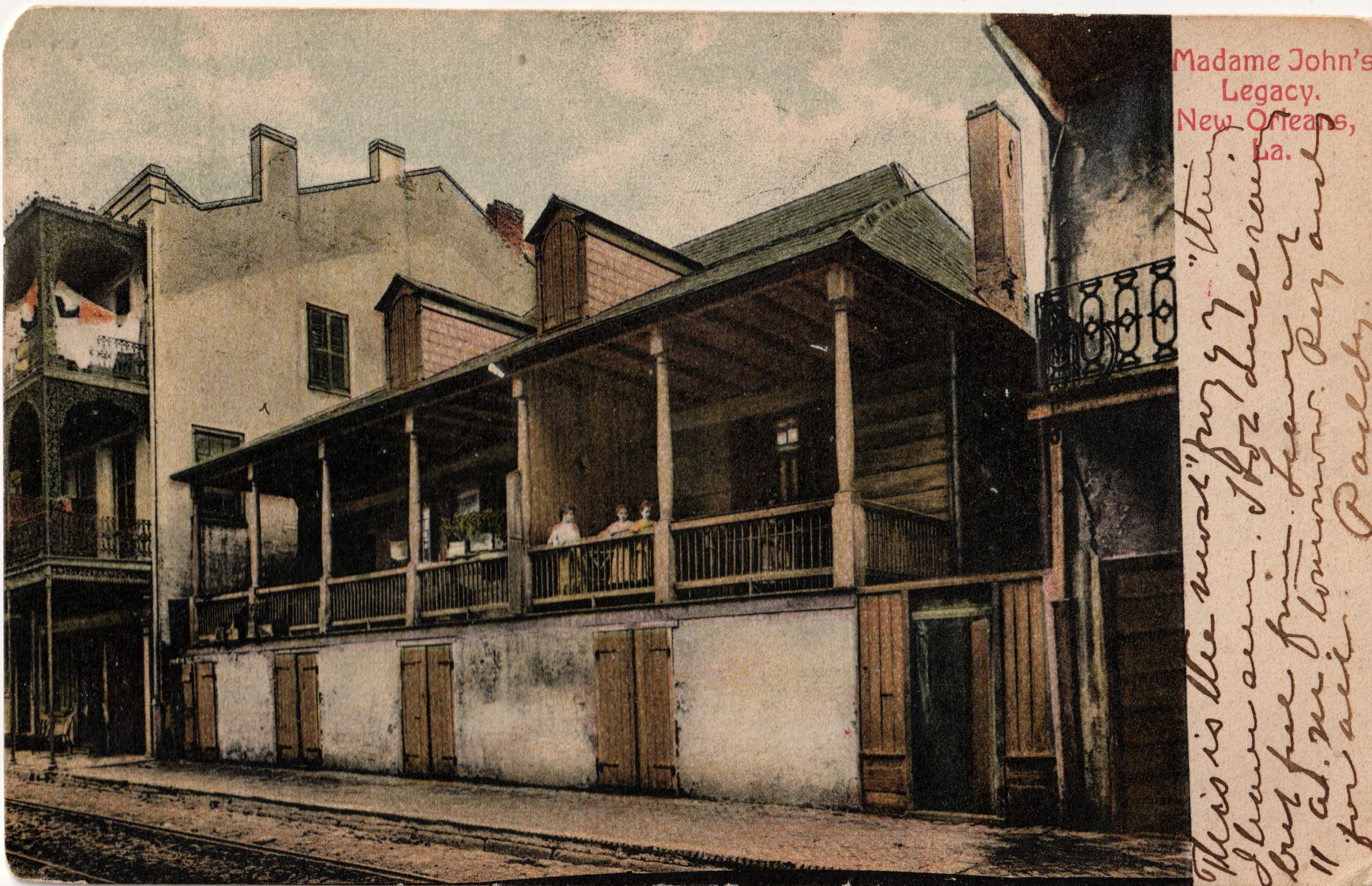
Madame John's Legacy, New Orleans, in about 1910

Madame John's Legacy stands north of Jackson Square, on the southwest side of Dumaine Street between Royal and Chartres Streets. The building's name derives from the story "Tite Poulette" by New Orleans author George Washington Cable, and refers to a building that previously stood on the site. It is a French colonial raised cottage, its ground level a full-height basement built out of brick, and a wood frame main level above. The exterior is clad in wooden boards. Behind the main building is an open courtyard, with a brick slave quarters, kitchen, and garconnière at the rear of the property probably dating to the 1820s. The basement level of the house appears shorter than it was when built, in part because the street level has been raised in the intervening centuries.

== History ==
Although archival records point to 1788 as the date of completion for its construction, archaeological investigations suggest that the house possibly incorporates a significant amount of an earlier one built on the site circa 1730 by François Marin and occupied by his widow, the New Orleans businesswoman Elisabeth Réal, until her death in 1777. Following the 1788 fire, owner Manuel de Lanzos instructed the American contractor Robert Jones to recycle as much brick and iron hardware as possible from his damaged house, suggesting that enough of it survived the fire to be included in the rebuilding. Whether entirely rebuilt in 1788 or a restoration of a damaged structure, the house managed to survive the 1794 fire unscathed. It underwent a number of alterations in the 19th century, most notably as part of a conversion to apartments in the late 19th century.

In 1947, the house was donated to the Louisiana State Museum and operated as a museum until 1965, when it was closed due to hurricane damage. It was subjected to a painstaking restoration in the early 1970s, restoring it as much as possible to its late 18th-century appearance, and reopened.

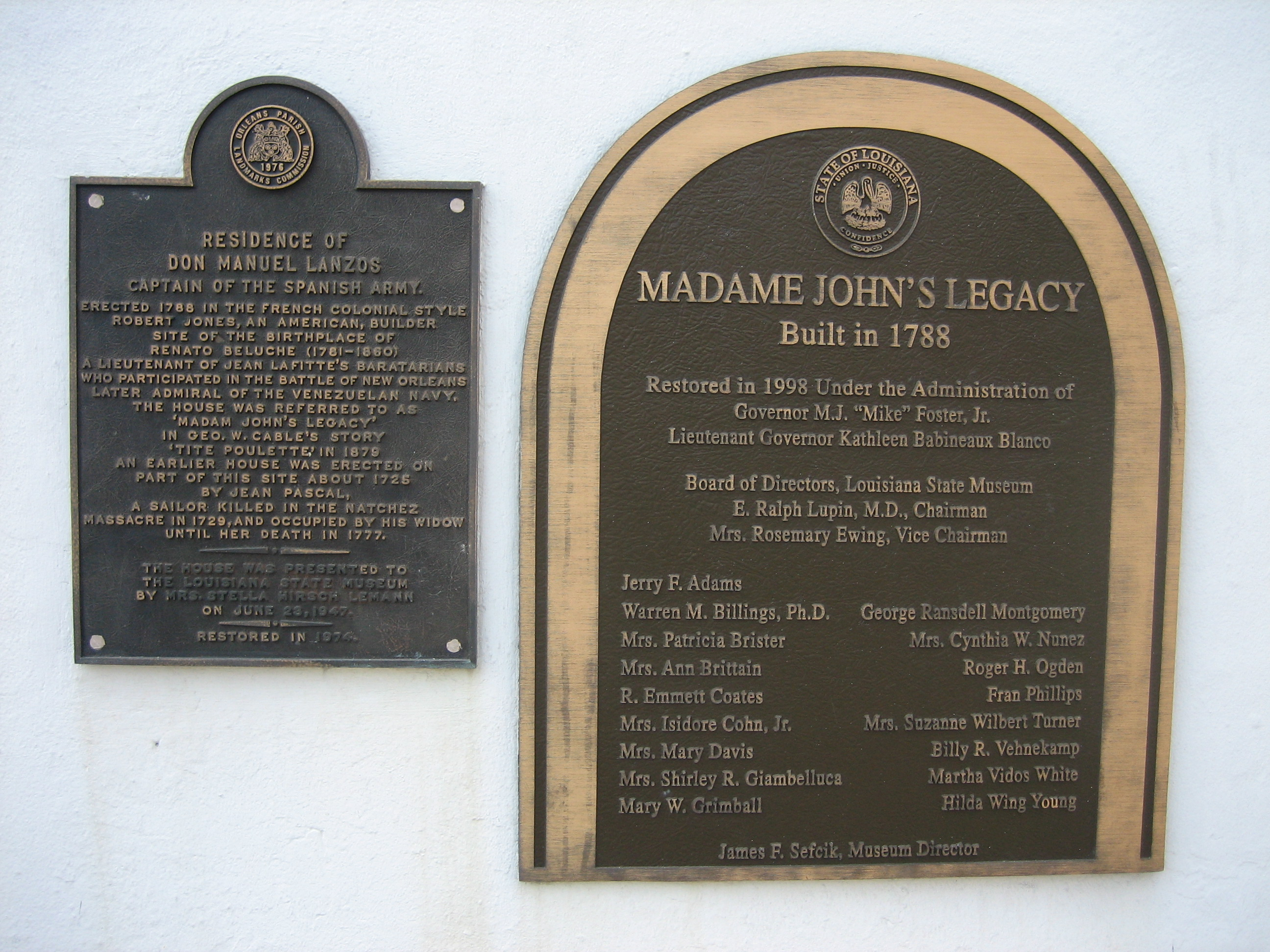
Historic markers on the "Madame John's Legacy" building in the French Quarter.

As of June 2026, the museum is closed for further restoration.

== In popular culture ==
This house is briefly seen in the 1994 movie Interview with the Vampire in a scene where caskets are being carried out of the house while Louis (Brad Pitt) is describing Lestat (Tom Cruise) and Claudia (Kirsten Dunst) going out on the town. Part of 12 Years a Slave was also filmed at the house.

== See also ==
- List of National Historic Landmarks in Louisiana
- List of the oldest buildings in Louisiana
- National Register of Historic Places listings in Orleans Parish, Louisiana
