= Louisiana History Museum =

- Old Alexandria Public Library: Houses Louisiana History Museum
- U.S. National Register of Historic Places
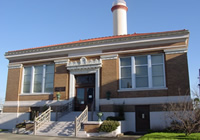

- Location within Louisiana Location within the United States
- Location: 503 Washington; Alexandria, Louisiana
- Coordinates: 31°18′31″N 92°26′43″W
- Built: 1907
- Architect: Crosby & Henkel; Caldwell Bros.
- Architectural style: Beaux Arts
- NRHP reference No.: 88003225
- Added to NRHP: January 19, 1989

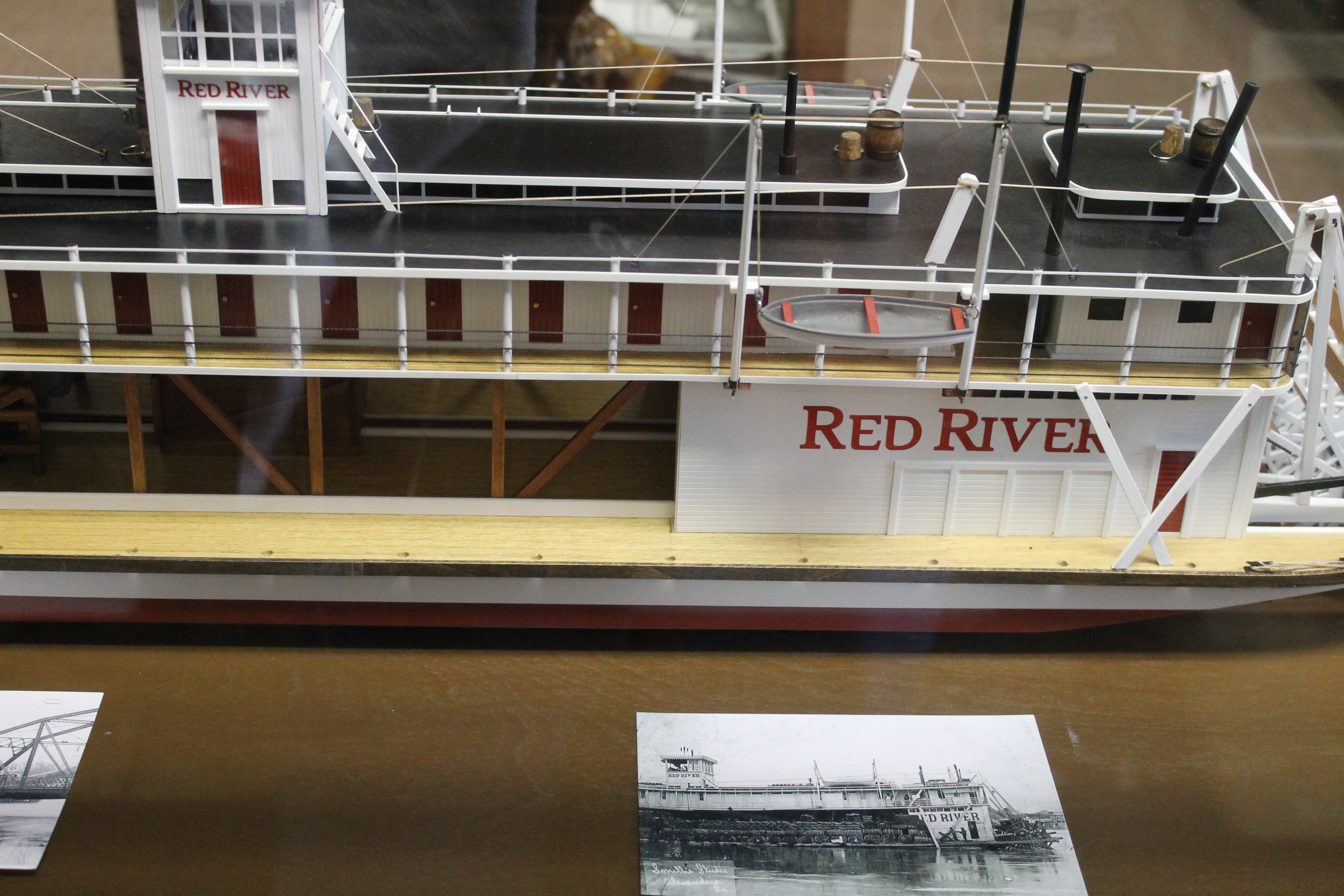
Scale model of the steamboat Red River

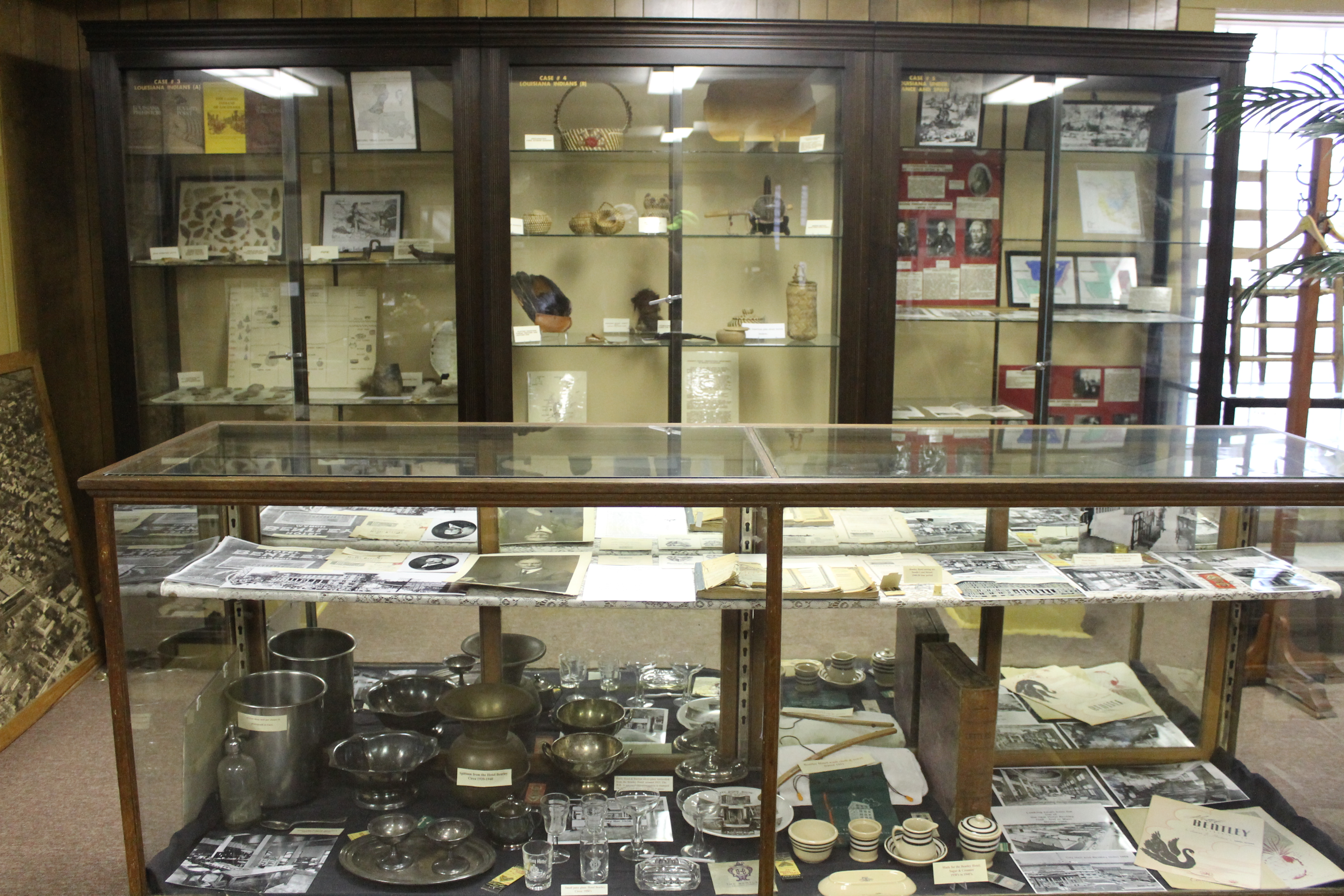
Artifacts in display cases

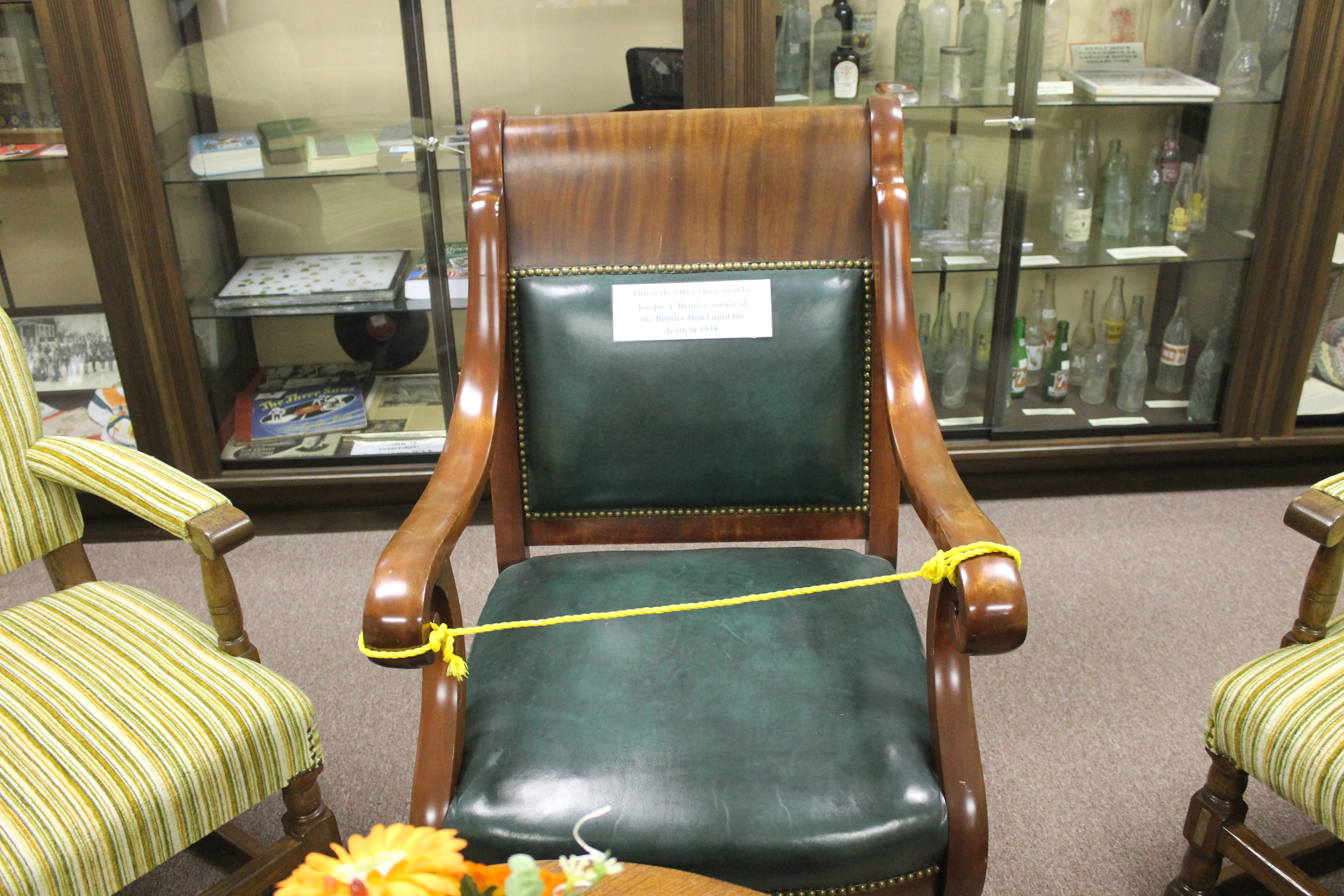
Chair used by Joseph Bentley, founder of the Bentley Hotel, on display

The Louisiana History Museum is located in the historic downtown portion of Alexandria, Louisiana, USA, near the Red River. It showcases the social evolution of all of Louisiana, but centers on the history of Central Louisiana, Rapides Parish, and Alexandria. Major exhibit areas deal with Native Americans, Louisiana geography, politics, health care, farming, and the impact of war.

== The old Alexandria Library building ==
The building housing the Museum and Alexandria Genealogical Library started life as the Alexandria Public Library in 1907. The building was constructed solely for the advancement of culture and learning in by Caldwell Brothers (contractors), and Crosby & Henkel of New Orleans (architects). It replaced an earlier library that was burned by General Nathaniel Banks' federal troops on May 13, 1864. Remodeled in 1970, restored as a Bicentennial project in 1976, and again in 2003, it now houses (upstairs) one of the largest genealogical libraries in Louisiana. The structure was placed on the National Register of Historic Places in 1989.

== Museum history ==
The Louisiana History Museum was begun in 1971 by Angelique Stafford "Gic" Kraushaar. Her vision was to establish a museum in Alexandria that would not only describe the history of Louisiana but also show the unique beginnings and background of Central Louisiana.

== Displays and exhibits ==
There are more than fifty displays and exhibits, including:

- Native Americans in Louisiana
- How the Alexandria town plat was laid out in 1805 by Alexander Fulton
- Louisiana under the rule of Spain, France and England
- Famous figures in Louisiana such as Governor Murphy J. Foster, Jr.
- The American Revolution
- Civil War
- Construction of the Civil War dam on the Red River by General Joseph Bailey
- Camp Beauregard, a United States Army facility in World War I
- The Louisiana Maneuvers and Camp Claiborne in Alexandria in World War II
- Politicians from the Central Louisiana area including Huey Long and Earl Kemp Long
- Central Louisiana in postcards

== See also ==
- Louisiana State Museum – Baton Rouge, New Orleans, and other locations
