= Louisiana State Museum =

Louisiana State Museums
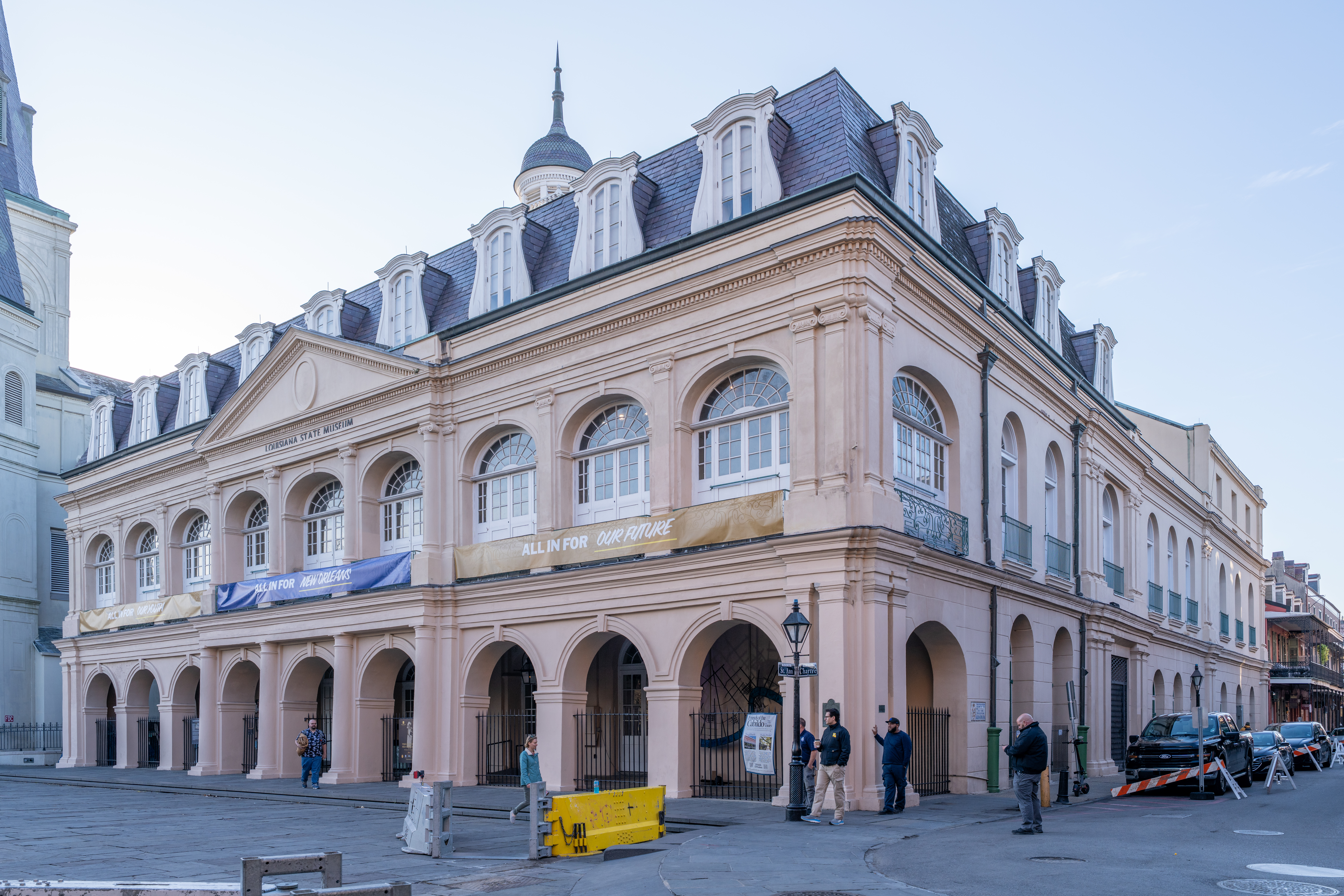
- Louisiana State Museum, The Presbytere
- Location: Louisiana
- Website: louisianastatemuseum.org

The Louisiana State Museum (LSM), founded in New Orleans in 1906, is a statewide system of National Historic Landmarks and modern structures across Louisiana, housing thousands of artifacts and works of art reflecting Louisiana's legacy of historic events and cultural diversity.

== Overview ==
The Louisiana State Museum system has its beginnings in the Louisiana Purchase Exposition in 1904 at St. Louis, Missouri. A large number of pertinent artifacts were gathered to be displayed at Louisiana's exhibition at this fair. After the Exposition, it was decided that this collection should be stored, expanded, and displayed. The Louisiana State Museum was established in 1906 to fulfill this role. The Presbytere and the Cabildo buildings, located on either side of the St. Louis Cathedral on Jackson Square, were some of the first properties that the Louisiana State Museum was lodged in. The Louisiana State Museum now has thirteen properties around the state: historic structures, museums open to the public, and modern purpose-built buildings.

Over the past 100-plus years, the Louisiana State Museum has not only operated museums and maintained buildings, but it has served as the repository for all things historic from the state’s past. As Louisiana has been part of a French colony, a Spanish colony, Napoleon’s short-lived property, the United States' Louisiana Purchase territory, and finally the state of Louisiana; the Louisiana State Museum’s collections of artifacts and documents are an important asset for understanding state, national, and even global history.

In addition to protecting and preserving Louisiana’s historic artifacts and buildings, the Louisiana State Museum is proactive in many areas concerning the state’s unique culture and history. Several new museum sites have opened in the last ten years or so, including the Wedell-Williams Aviation & Cypress Sawmill Museum - Patterson location, the Performing Arts Center at the New Orleans Mint, the Capitol Park Museum - Baton Rouge, and the Louisiana Sports Hall of Fame & Northwest Louisiana History Museum – Natchitoches. In addition to opening new facilities, the State Museum is continually creating new temporary and permanent exhibits, bringing to light intriguing topics from Louisiana’s culture and history. The Museum hosts an array of programs such as lecture series, school group educational tours, walking tours of historic districts, and musical performances.

Numerous organizations exist throughout Louisiana to support the Museum including the Louisiana Museum Foundation, Friends of the Cabildo, Friends of the Capitol Park Museum, Wedell-Williams and Cypress Sawmill Foundation, Friends of Louisiana Sports and History, and Friends of the E.D. White Historic Site.

== Sites in the French Quarter, New Orleans ==
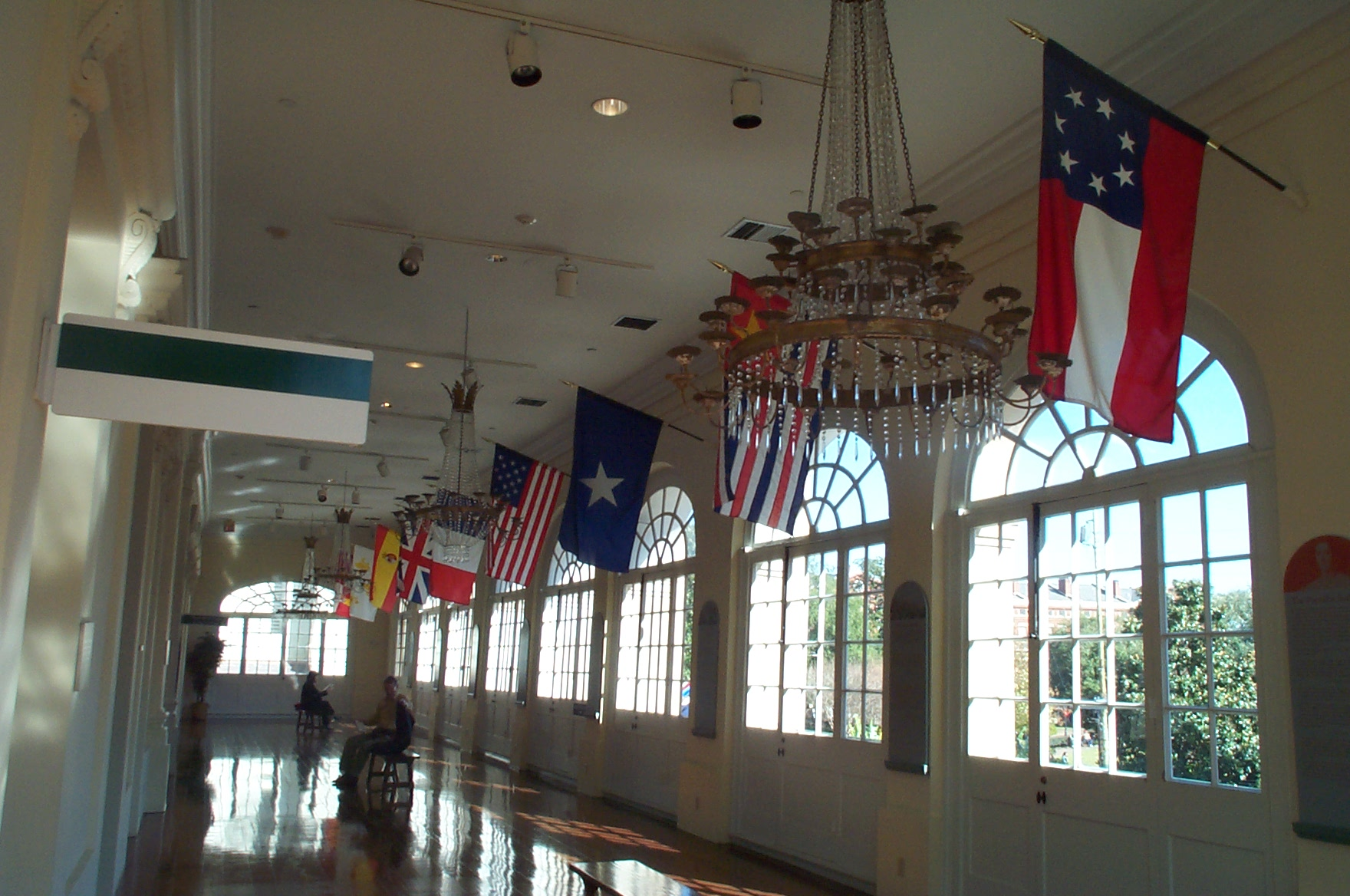
2nd Floor gallery of the Cabildo, 10 flags over Louisiana

- The Cabildo - Spain's old City Hall, or "Casa Capitular," built in 1799. Site of the two Louisiana Purchase transfers of 1803 (from Spain to France, and from France to the U.S.). Housed various government offices, including the Louisiana Supreme Court. The Cabildo displays three floors of exhibits concerning Louisiana's history, with additional changing exhibits in the adjoining Arsenal building.

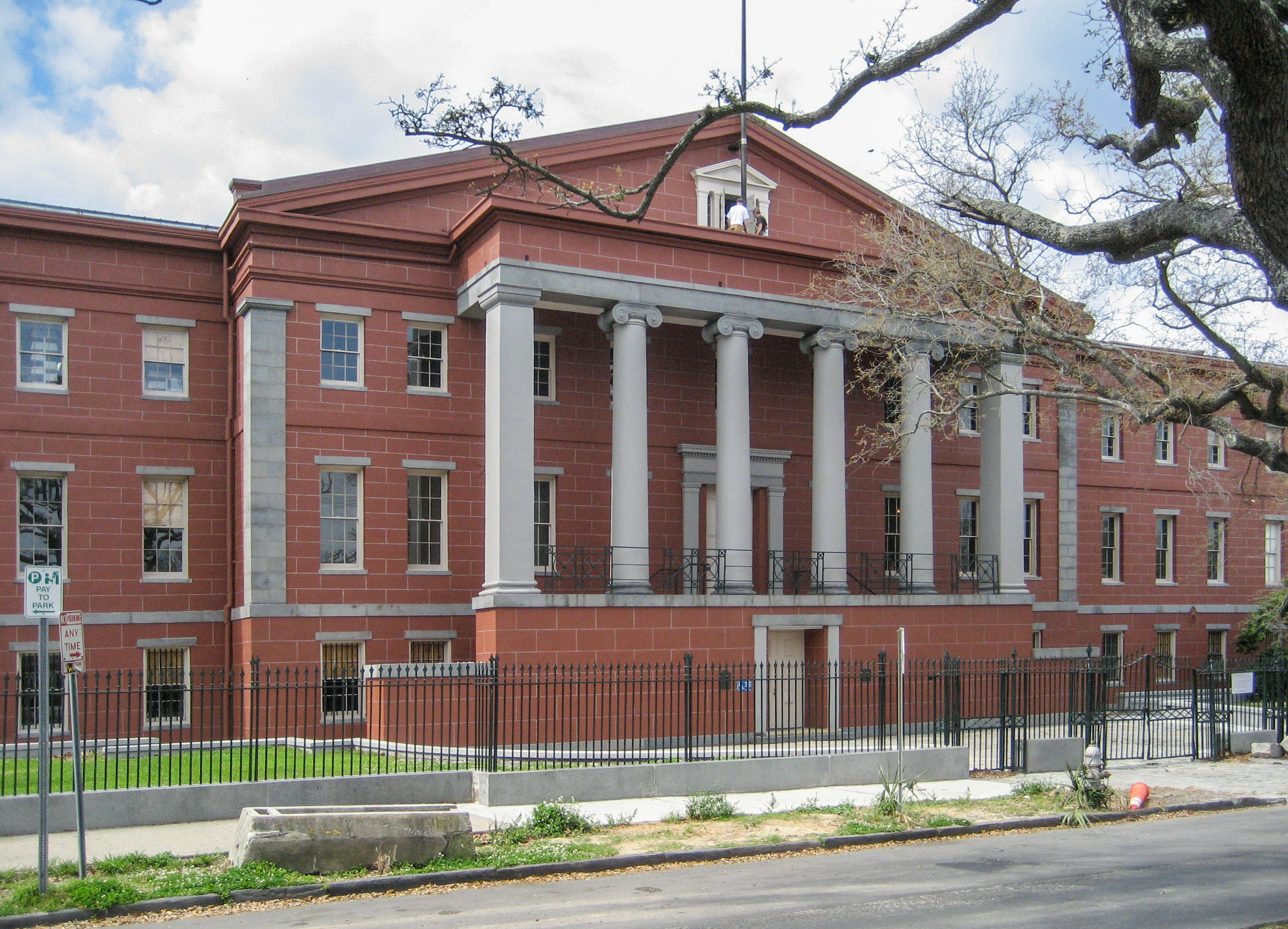
Old U.S. Mint Museum

- New Orleans Mint - A United States Mint built under the direction of President Andrew Jackson in 1835. It was the only U.S. Mint to ever mint under a flag other than that of the United States, as it briefly minted coins for the Confederacy. The building also served as a federal prison and a Coast Guard depot before becoming a Louisiana State Museum. There is a permanent exhibit on the Mint's coining operations, exhibits on Louisiana music on the 2nd floor, a Performing Arts Center on the 3rd floor, and the Louisiana Historical Center and archives on the 3rd floor.
- The Presbytère - Originally built to serve as housing for the local clergy, it served many functions before becoming a Louisiana State Museum property in 1911. The first two floors house exhibits and the third floor houses the State Museum offices.

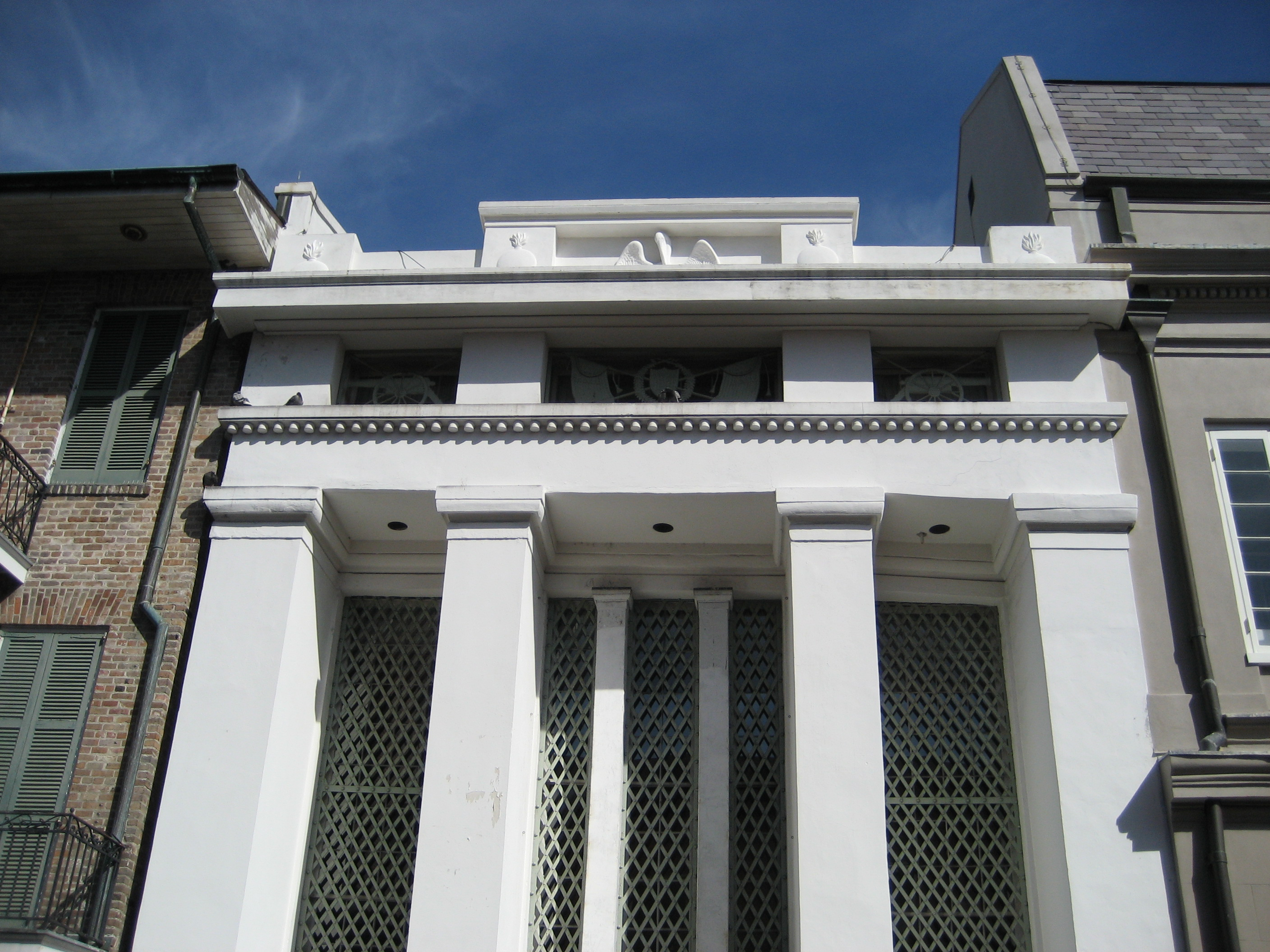
Façade of the Arsenal

- The Arsenal - Built in 1839, the Arsenal stands adjacent to the Cabildo on the site of the old Spanish Arsenal built in 1762. Its first floor acts as a classroom for visiting school groups, the second floor houses changing exhibits, and the third floor serves as meeting space. The Arsenal is accessible through the adjoining Cabildo museum.

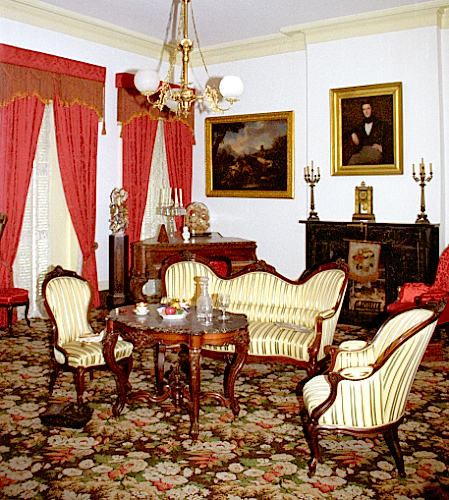
1850 House exhibit

- 1850 House, a historic house museum in the Lower Pontalba Building. The 1850 House museum depicts middle-class family life during the most prosperous period in New Orleans' history through a fully furnished three story apartment in the Lower Pontalba building. The first floor houses a museum gift shop, operated by Friends of the Cabildo.
- The Creole House - Built in 1842 on the site of a colonial prison, the Creole House is the headquarters for the Friends of the Cabildo, the Louisiana State Museum's support foundation for the French Quarter museums.
- The Jackson House - This structure derives its name from Andrew Jackson, the hero of the Battle of New Orleans. The original 1842 building was rebuilt by the WPA in 1936. There are currently no exhibits on display.

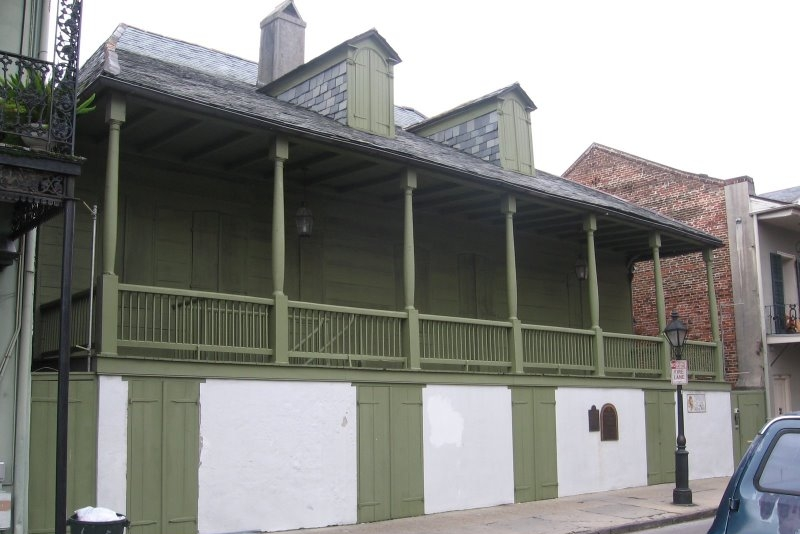
Madame John's Legacy

- Madame John's Legacy - A building of historic significance because it escaped the Great New Orleans Fire (1794), which leveled much of New Orleans, the house is actually a product of the preceding fire of 1788. The structures on the site in the early 1780s were partially destroyed by that conflagration and the current structure was rebuilt in the same French colonial fashion six months later.

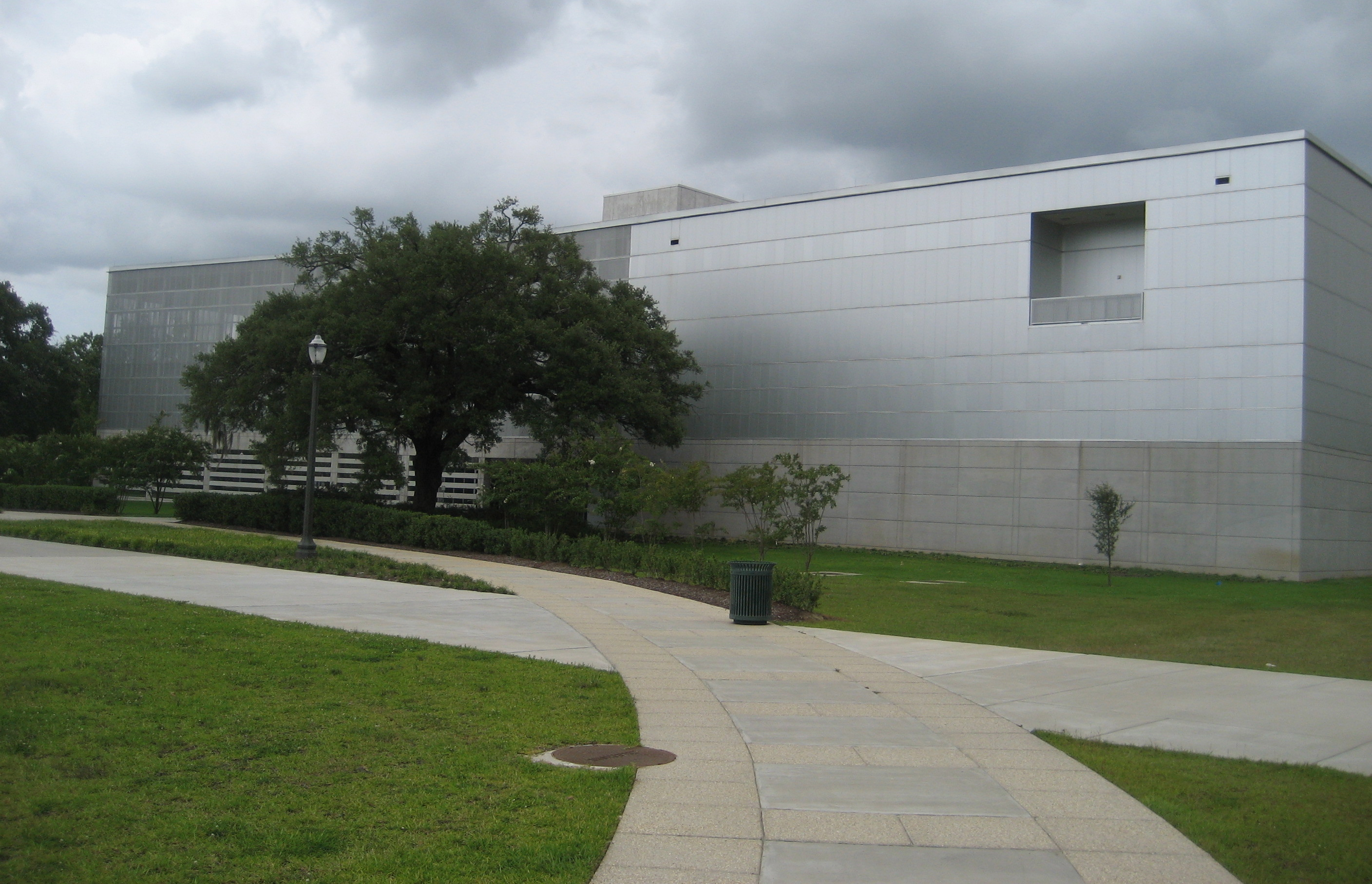
Capitol Park Museum, in Baton Rouge

== Capitol Park Museum – Baton Rouge ==
The Capitol Park Museum - Baton Rouge features thematic exhibits on the diverse aspects of Louisiana history, industry, and culture. The museum includes two permanent exhibitions, entitled "Grounds for Greatness: Louisiana and the Nation," and "Experiencing Louisiana: Discovering the Soul of America."

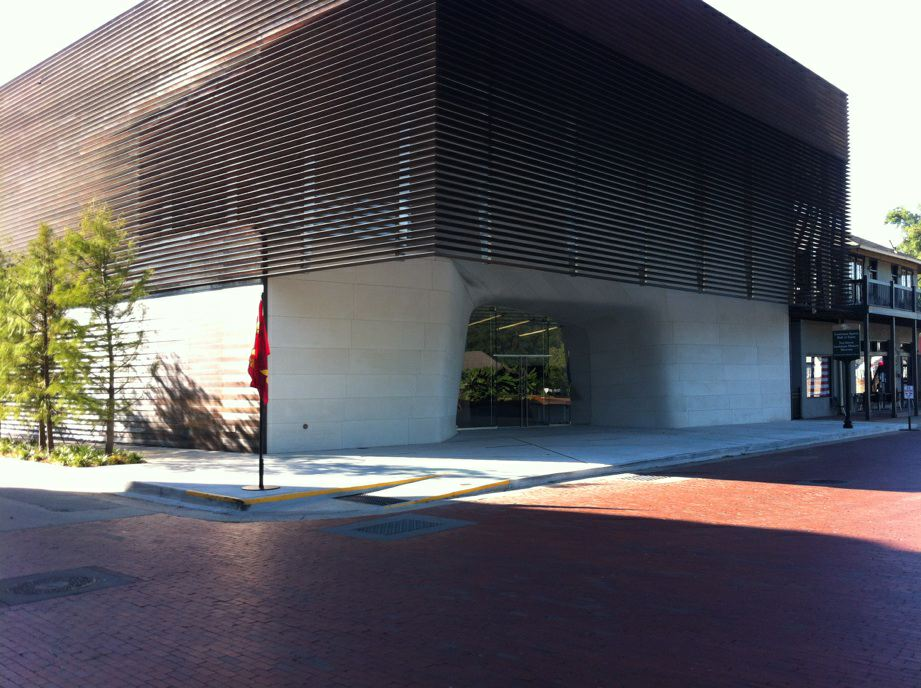
Louisiana Sports Hall of Fame

== Louisiana Sports Hall of Fame & Northwest Louisiana History Museum – Natchitoches ==
The Louisiana Sports Hall of Fame & Northwest Louisiana History Museum – Natchitoches is the Louisiana State Museum's newest facility. The Louisiana Sports Hall of Fame exhibit is a collection of portraits and memorabilia celebrating the achievements of more than 300 legendary Louisiana athletes, coaches, and other sports figures. The Northwest Louisiana History Museum explores the evolution of unique cultural traditions from early native-American civilizations to the present.

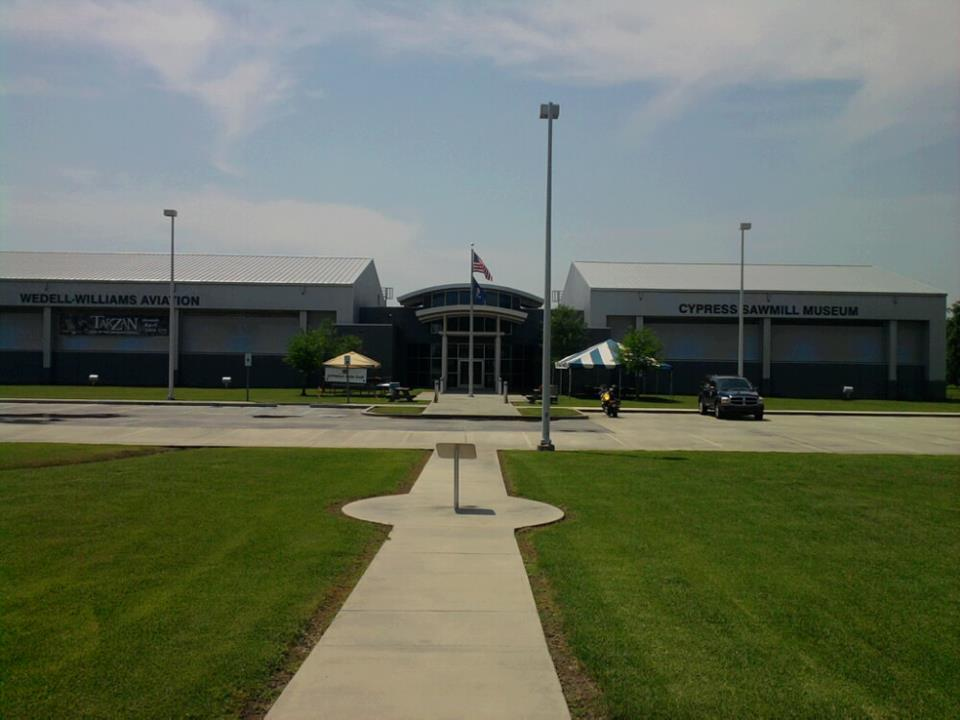
Aviation & Cypress Sawmill

== Wedell-Williams Aviation & Cypress Sawmill Museum – Patterson ==
The Wedell-Williams Aviation & Cypress Sawmill Museum - Patterson is a modern purpose-built facility located in Acadiana. The Wedell-Williams Aviation Collection focuses on the legacy of Louisiana aviation pioneers Jimmie Wedell and Harry Williams, who formed an air service in Patterson in 1928, while the Patterson Cypress Sawmill Collection documents the history of the cypress lumber industry in Louisiana.

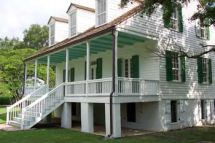
E.D. White

== E. D. White Historic Site – Thibodaux ==
The E. D. White Historic Site, located in Thibodaux, is the 1800s plantation home of Edward Douglass White, Sr., who was governor from 1835 to 1839, and his son, Edward Douglass White, who was appointed to the United States Supreme Court in 1894 and served as chief justice from 1910 to 1921. The E.D. White House exhibits trace the region's history with sections about the Chitimacha Natives, Bayou Lafourche, early Acadian settlers, sugar cane agriculture, slavery, and the White family.

== Collections ==
The Louisiana State Museum has two main collections facilities in New Orleans. The main collections facility is located within the French Quarter. This facility houses Visual Arts, Costumes & Textiles, Science & Technology, and the Decorative Arts Collection.

The second facility is the Old U.S. Mint on Esplanade Avenue, which houses the Document Archives and Jazz & Music Archives. The Mint houses the Louisiana Historical Center, which gives amateur and professional researchers the opportunity to access the Document Archives. In addition to maps and manuscripts, the Center houses sheet music, microfilm, scrapbooks, pamphlets, and newspapers.

Both collections facilities are accessible by appointment only.

== Extra-exhibit programming in New Orleans & Baton Rouge ==
- Hidden Treasures: A lecture series that takes guests behind the scenes into the Louisiana State Museum's archives in New Orleans to view artifacts relevant to the topic being discussed.
- 2nd Thursdays Lecture Series: A recurring lecture series featuring the unique topics of Louisiana's culture and history.
- Music at the Mint: The Louisiana State Museum hosts concerts of many different genres including jazz, blues, and instrumentals on the third floor of the Old U.S. Mint in the Performing Arts Center.
- New Orleans Jazz National Historic Park performances and lectures: In cooperation with the Louisiana State Museum, almost daily at the Old U.S. Mint, the National Park Service hosts free interpretive performances and/or lectures on the roots of Jazz.
- Colonial Documents Digitization Project: The Louisiana State Museum is currently underway with efforts to make accessible and preserve over 70,000 French and Spanish judicial and notarial documents housed in the Louisiana Historical Center. The museum has received a grant from the National Endowment for the Humanities to digitize these colonial-era records and create an online database that will be free and accessible to anyone interested in learning more about colonial Louisiana.
- Lunchtime Lagniappe Summer Lecture Series at Capitol Park: A weekly series of lectures that explores the rich culture and history of Louisiana every Wednesday in March and October at the Capitol Park Museum in Baton Rouge.
- Capitol Park & Spanish Town Walking Tours: The Capitol Park Walking Tour, 1st Saturday of April and 1st Saturday of September, provides a history of the different historic parts of Capitol Park. The Spanish Town Walking Tour, 1st Saturday in May and 1st Saturday in October, provides information about the historic Spanish Town Neighborhood.

== See also ==
- Louisiana History Museum – Alexandria
