= The Presbytere =

- U.S. National Register of Historic Places
- U.S. National Historic Landmark
- U.S. National Historic Landmark District – Contributing property
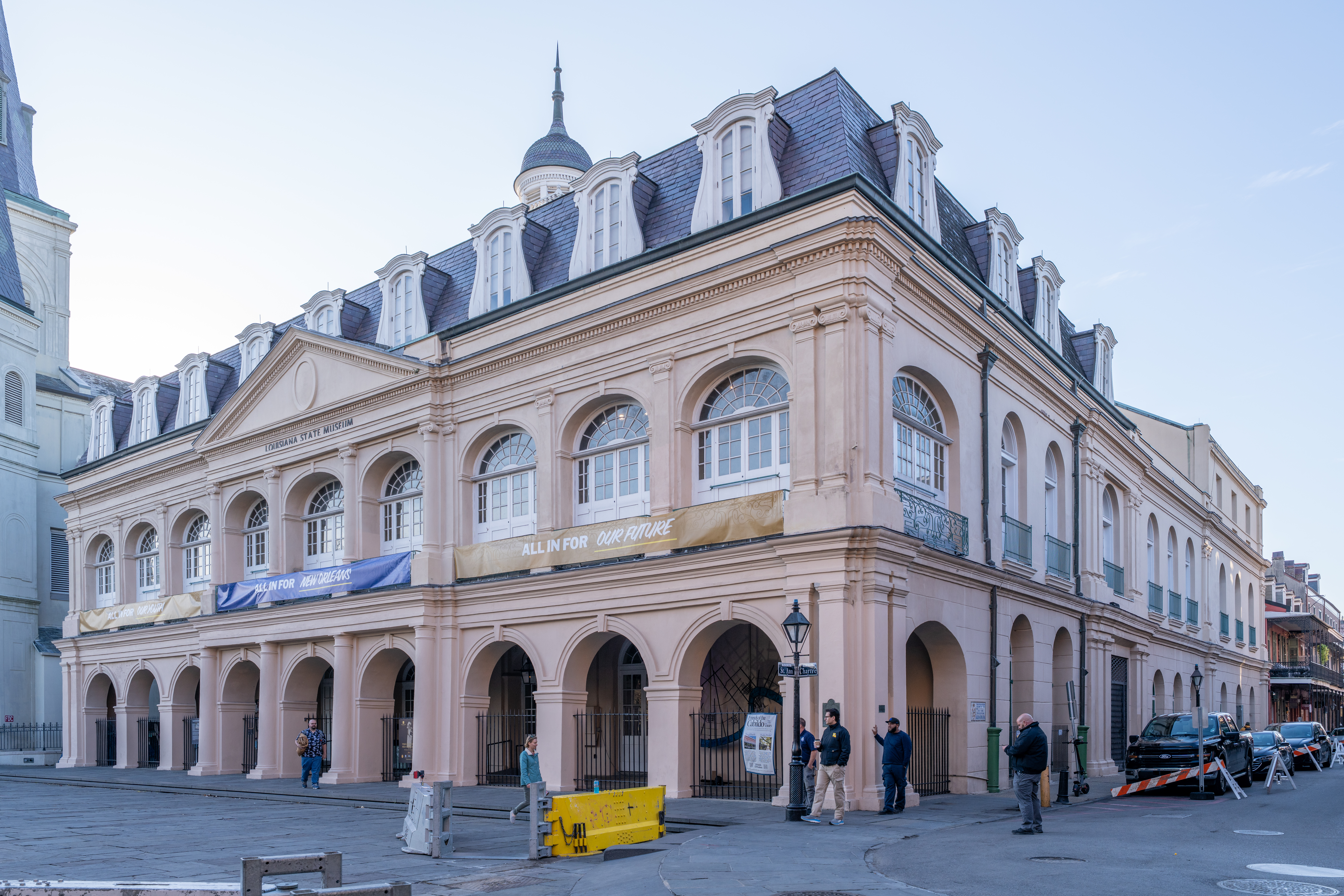
- The Presbytère, seen from Jackson Square

- Location within East New Orleans Location within Louisiana Location within the United States
- Location: 751 Chartres St., New Orleans, Louisiana
- Coordinates: 29°57′28.91″N 90°3′49.57″W
- Built: 1813
- Architect: Guilberto Guillemard
- Architectural style: Colonial
- Part of: Vieux Carre Historic District (ID66000377)
- NRHP reference No.: 70000257

Significant dates
- Added to NRHP: April 15, 1970
- Designated NHL: April 15, 1970
- Designated NHLDCP: December 21, 1965

The Presbytère is an architecturally important building in the French Quarter of New Orleans, Louisiana. It stands facing Jackson Square, adjacent to the St. Louis Cathedral. Built in 1813 as a matching structure for the Cabildo, which flanks the cathedral on the other side, it is one of the nation's best examples of formal colonial Spanish architecture (with many neo-Renaissance elements). It was designated a National Historic Landmark in 1970, and is now a property of the Louisiana State Museum.

== Description ==
The Presbytère is located on the northeast side of Jackson Square, between the cathedral and St. Ann Street. It is a two-story brick building, originally built with a flat roof that had a balustrade topped by urns. Its ground floor has a nine-bay open arcade of elliptical arches, with pilastered corners. The upper level also has arched openings, all articulated by pilasters, with multipane windows. The center three bays on both levels have engaged columns on either side, and are topped as a group by a gabled pediment. A dormered mansard roof was added in 1847, which is topped by a louvered cupola.

== History ==
The Presbytère was designed in 1791 by the French-born Gilberto Guillemard to match the Cabildo, or Town Hall, on the other side of St. Louis Cathedral. By 1798, only the first floor had been completed, and its second floor was not completed until 1813. Originally called the Casa Curial (‘Ecclesiastical House’), its name derives from the fact that it was built on the former site of the residence of the Capuchin friars and presbytery (rectory, presbytère in French). While intended to house clergy, it was never used as a religious residence. The building initially was used for commercial purposes until 1834, when it was used by the Louisiana Supreme Court.

In 1853, cathedral officials sold the Presbytère to the city, and in 1908 the city sold it to the state. In 1911 it became part of the Louisiana State Museum. It was declared a National Historic Landmark in 1970.

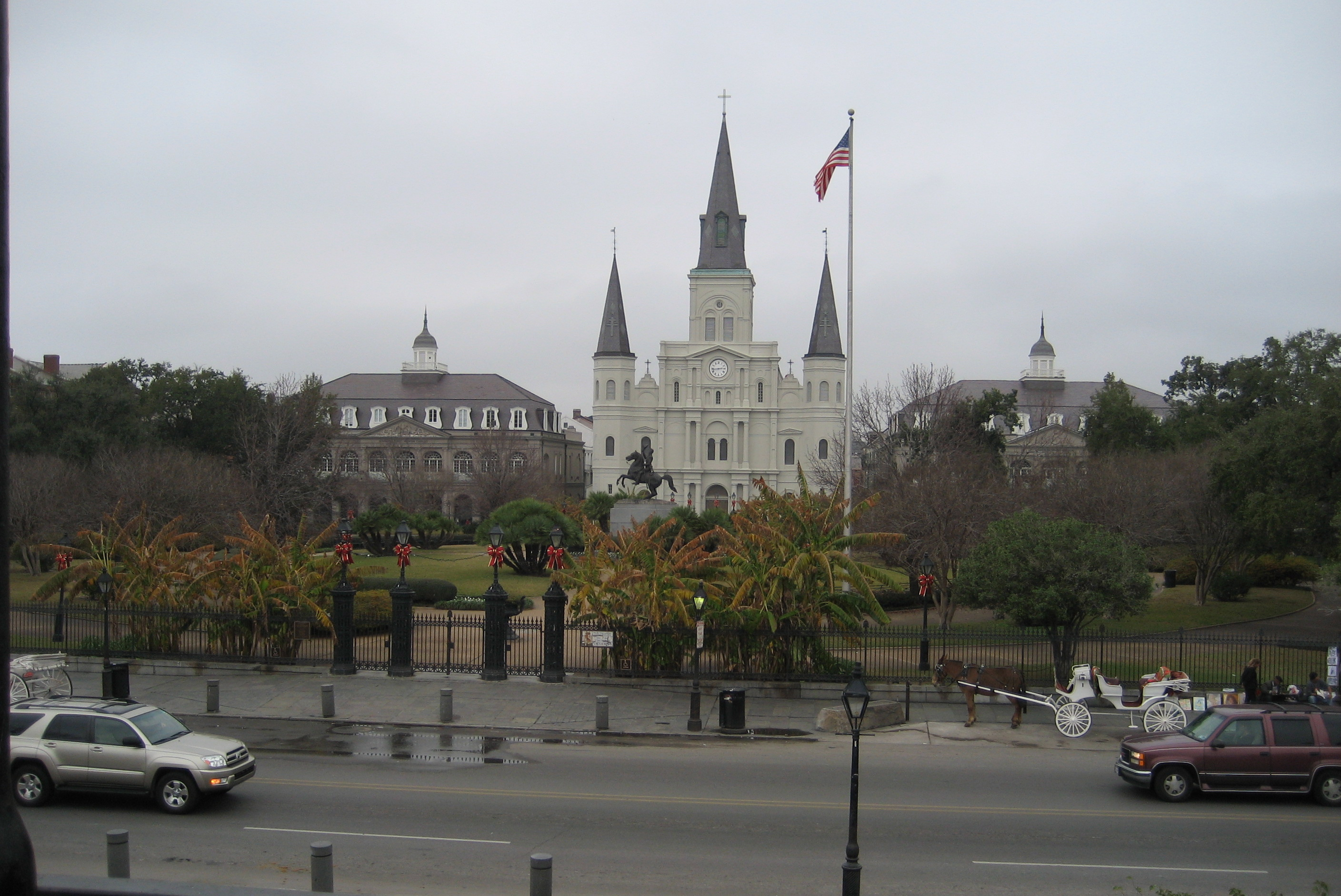
View of Jackson Square. The Cathedral is the central building, with the Cabildo to the left and the Presbytere to the right.

In 2005, the cupola was replaced atop the Presbytère. The cupola had been missing since the New Orleans Hurricane of 1915.

== See also ==
- The Cabildo
- List of National Historic Landmarks in Louisiana
- List of the oldest buildings in Louisiana
- National Register of Historic Places listings in Orleans Parish, Louisiana
