= The Cabildo =

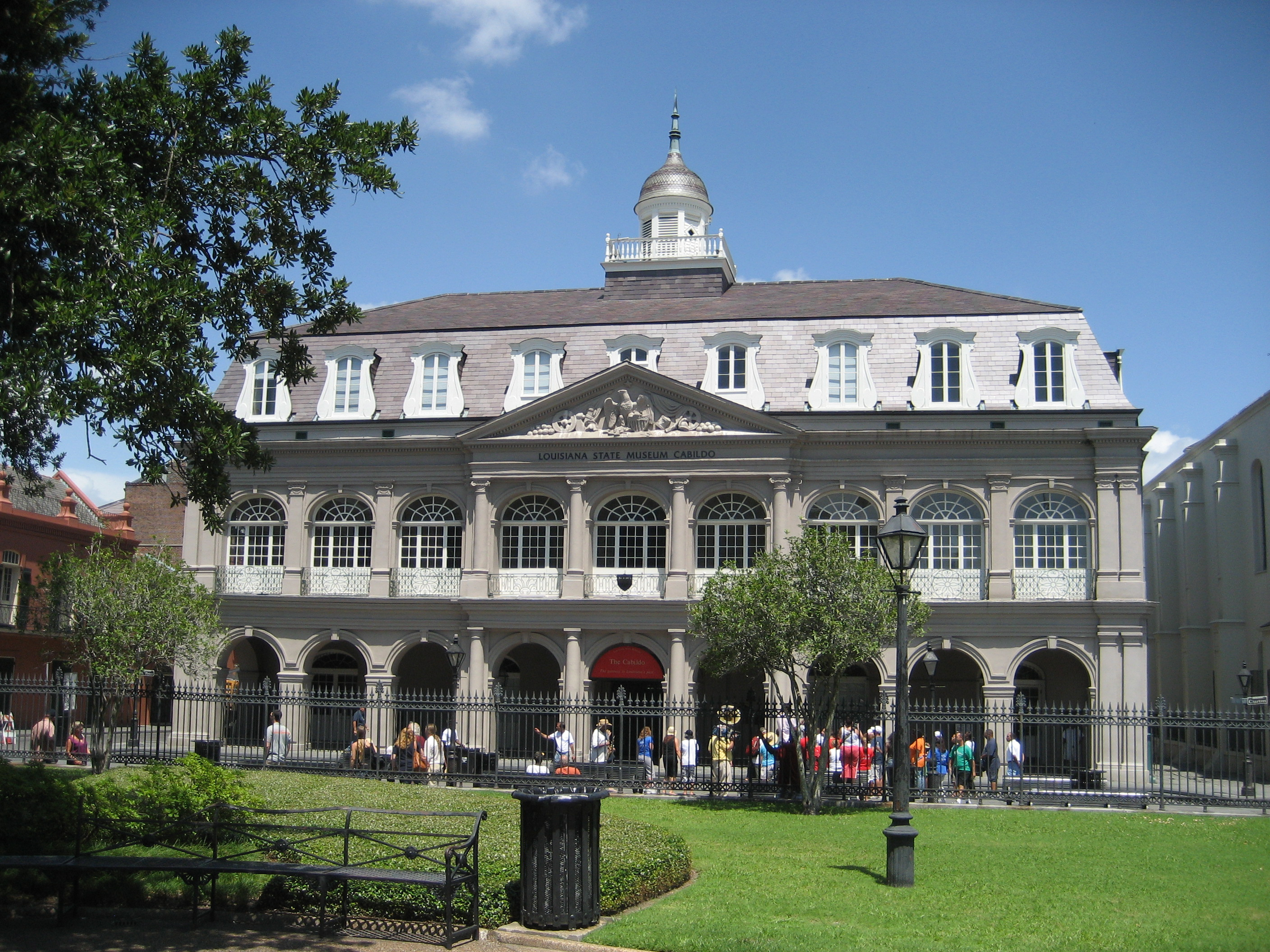
- The Cabildo has Spanish arches with a French mansard roof.
- Interactive map of the The Cabildo area
- Former names: Casa Capitular

General information
- Architectural style: Spanish Baroque; mansard roof and third floor in French-Revival
- Location: 701 Chartres St., New Orleans, Louisiana
- Construction started: 1795
- Completed: 1799

Design and construction
- Architect: Gilberto Guillemard
- The Cabildo
- U.S. National Register of Historic Places
- U.S. National Historic Landmark
- U.S. National Historic Landmark District – Contributing property
- Part of: Vieux Carre Historic District (ID66000377)
- NRHP reference No.: 66000373

Significant dates
- Added to NRHP: October 15, 1966
- Designated NHL: October 9, 1960
- Designated NHLDCP: December 21, 1965

The Cabildo, originally called "Casa Capitular", is a historical building in New Orleans, Louisiana. Originally the seat of Spanish colonial city hall, the building now forms part of the Louisiana State Museum. It is located along Jackson Square, adjacent to St. Louis Cathedral.

== History ==
The original Cabildo was destroyed in the Great New Orleans Fire of 1788. The building was rebuilt between 1795 and 1799 as the home of the Spanish municipal government in New Orleans. In 1821, the Spanish coat of arms was removed from the façade pediment and replaced with the extant American eagle with cannonballs by the Italian sculptor Pietro Cardelli and the third floor with mansard roof was later added in 1847, in the French style. The building took its name from the governing body who met there—the "Illustrious Cabildo," or city council. The Cabildo was the site of the Louisiana Purchase transfer ceremonies late in 1803, and continued to be used by the New Orleans city council until the mid-1850s.

The building's main hall, the Sala Capitular ("Meeting Room"), was originally utilized as a courtroom. The Spanish used the courtroom from 1799 to 1803, and from 1803 to 1812 it was used by the Louisiana territorial superior court. Between 1868 and 1910, the Cabildo was the seat of the Louisiana Supreme Court. The Sala Capitular was the site of several landmark court cases, including Plessy v. Ferguson.

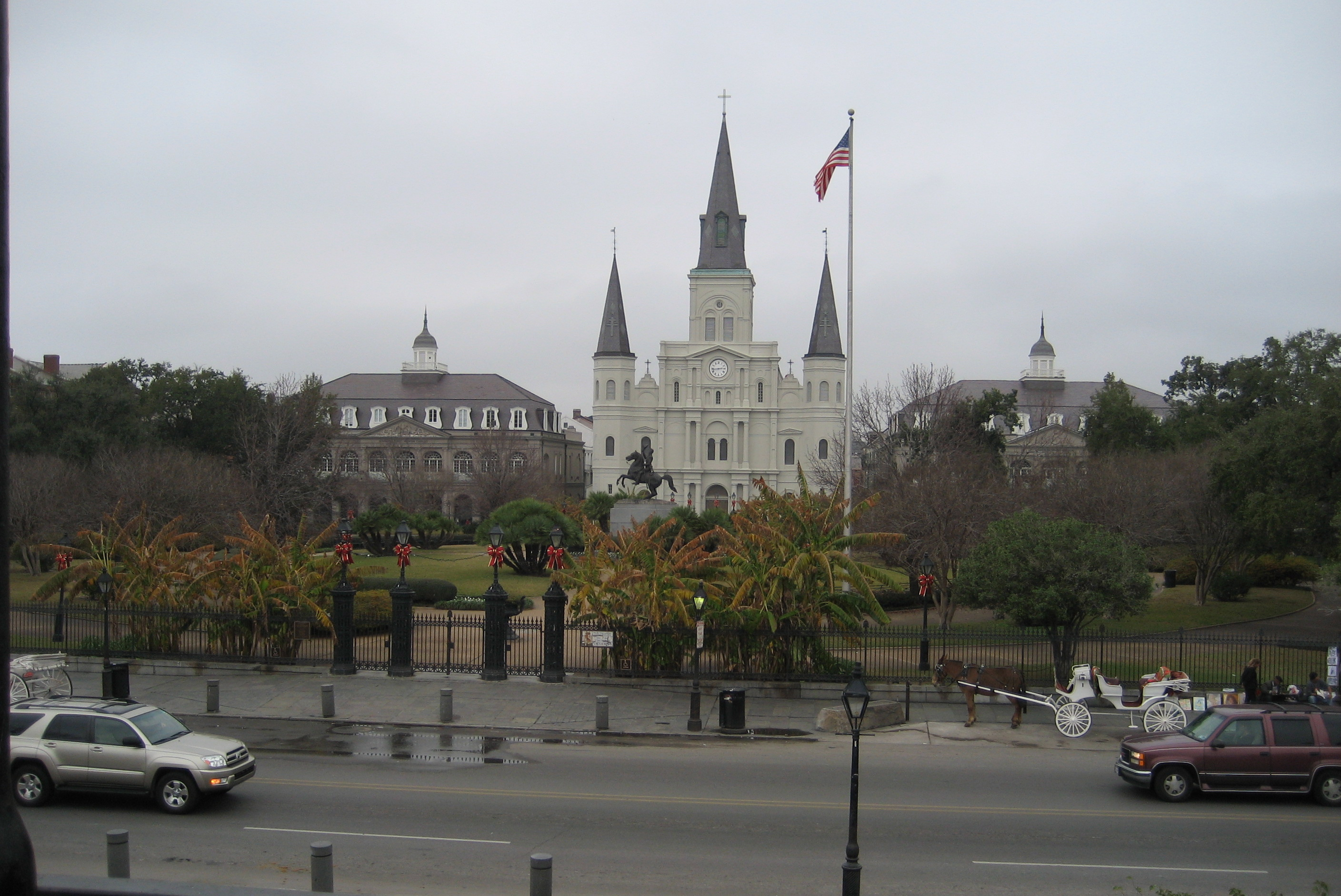
The Cabildo is left of St. Louis Cathedral at Jackson Square.

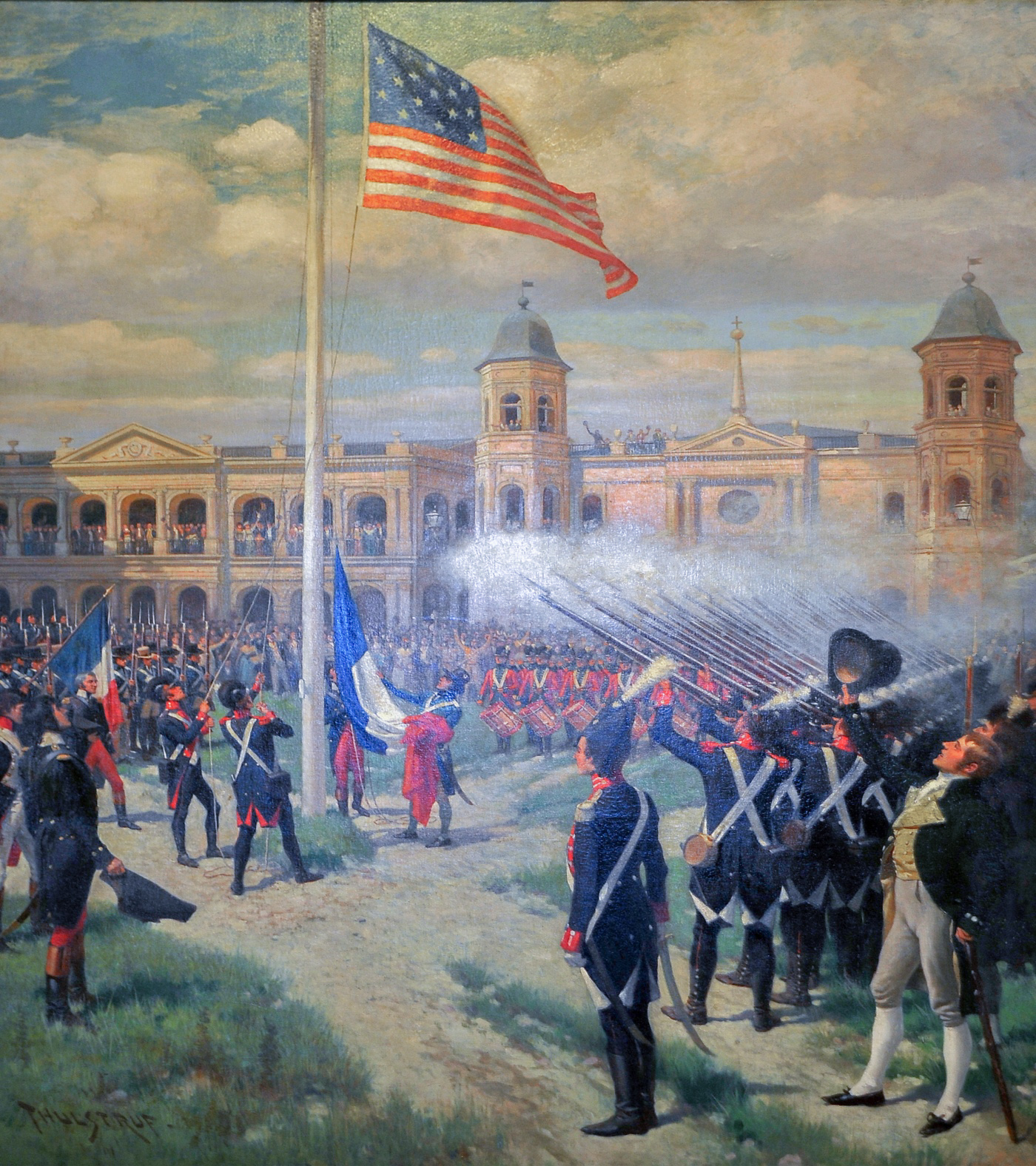
The French flag is removed and the American flag is hoisted in New Orleans after the Louisiana Purchase. In the background is the former appearance of the Cathedral of New Orleans of Spanish factory, built in 1794 during the Spanish rule. At the left is the Spanish Cabildo. Louisiana State Museum.

In 1895, the building was in a state of decay and proposed for demolition; artist William Woodward led a successful campaign to have the historic building preserved and restored. In 1911, with the state's highest court having vacated, the Cabildo became the home of the Louisiana State Museum. The museum displays exhibits about the history of Louisiana from its settlement up through the Reconstruction Era, and about the heritage of the ethnic groups who have lived in the state. The Cabildo was declared a National Historic Landmark in 1960.

The Cabildo was extensively damaged by a fire on May 11, 1988, which destroyed the cupola and the entire third floor, but it was restored and reopened to the public in 1994. In 2005, the Cabildo survived Hurricane Katrina, the eye of which passed 30 miles (48 km) east of downtown, with relatively minor damage. Days after the storm struck, the Louisiana State Police used the business offices of the Cabildo to set up what was called Troop N. From the Cabildo, state troopers patrolled the city's streets along with police agencies from New Mexico and New York.

== See also ==
- Louisiana (New Spain)
- Vieux Carré – the surrounding area
- Louisiana Purchase
- Louisiana State Museum
- The Presbytère, the twin of the Cabildo
- List of National Historic Landmarks in Louisiana
- National Register of Historic Places listings in Orleans Parish, Louisiana
- USS Cabildo, a dock landing ship of the United States Navy, named for The Cabildo
