= Martial Billeaud Jr. House =

Historic house in Louisiana

- U.S. National Register of Historic Places
- Location within Louisiana Location within the United States
- Location: 118 North Morgan Avenue, Broussard, Louisiana
- Coordinates: 30°08′56″N 91°57′50″W
- Area: less than one acre
- Built: 1893
- Architectural style: Second Empire, Queen Anne
- MPS: Broussard MRA
- NRHP reference No.: 83000516
- Added to NRHP: March 14, 1983

The Martial Billeaud Jr. House is a historic house located at 118 North Morgan Avenue in Broussard, Louisiana.

Built in 1893, the house is a large Queen Anne style frame cottage with a projecting bay with a mansard roof. It's the only example of Second Empire architecture in Lafayette Parish.

The house was listed on the National Register of Historic Places on March 14, 1983.

It is one of 10 individually NRHP-listed houses in the "Broussard Multiple Resource Area", which also includes:

- Alesia House
- Billeaud House
- Valsin Broussard House
- Comeaux House
- Ducrest Building
- Janin Store
- Roy-LeBlanc House
- St. Cecilia School
- St. Julien House
- Main Street Historic District

== See also ==
- National Register of Historic Places listings in Lafayette Parish, Louisiana
