= Ducrest Building =

- U.S. National Register of Historic Places
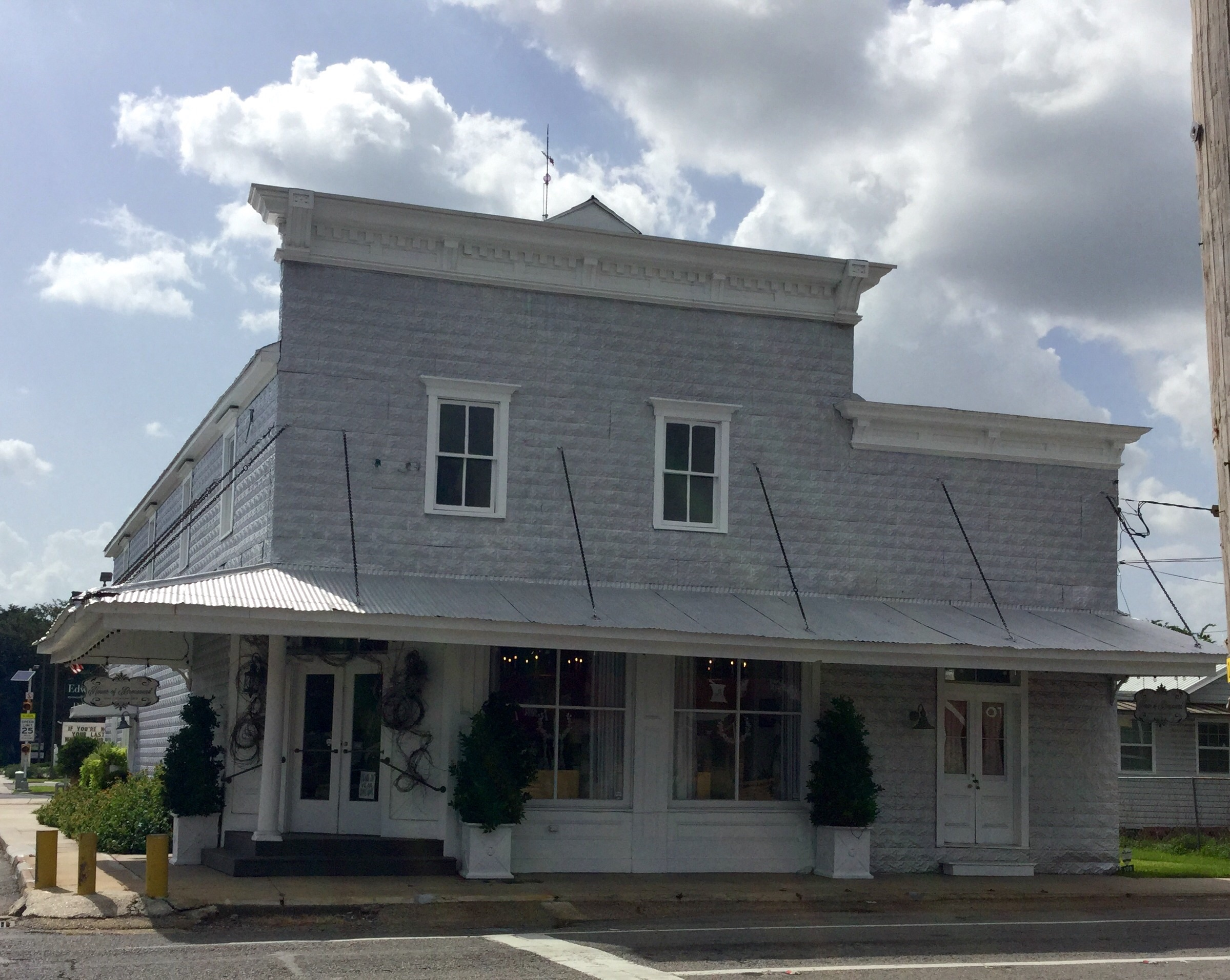

- Location within Louisiana Location within the United States
- Location: 100 West Main Street, Broussard, Louisiana
- Coordinates: 30°08′54″N 91°57′51″W
- Built: 1903
- Built by: T. Lucien Ducrest
- Architectural style: Italianate
- MPS: Broussard MRA
- NRHP reference No.: 83000519
- Added to NRHP: March 14, 1983

The Ducrest Building, also known as DeBaillon's Pharmacy, is a historic commercial building located at 100 West Main Street in Broussard, Louisiana, United States.

Built in 1903 by T. Lucien Ducrest which operated a pharmacy there, the building is a two-story frame commercial building in Italianate style.

The building was listed on the National Register of Historic Places on March 14, 1983.

It is one of 10 individually NRHP-listed houses in the "Broussard Multiple Resource Area", which also includes:

- Alesia House
- Billeaud House
- Martial Billeaud Jr. House
- Valsin Broussard House
- Comeaux House
- Janin Store
- Roy-LeBlanc House
- St. Cecilia School
- St. Julien House
- Main Street Historic District

== See also ==
- National Register of Historic Places listings in Lafayette Parish, Louisiana
