= National Register of Historic Places listings in Lafayette Parish, Louisiana =

Location of Lafayette Parish in Louisiana

This is a list of the National Register of Historic Places listings in Lafayette Parish, Louisiana.

This is intended to be a complete list of the properties and districts on the National Register of Historic Places in Lafayette Parish, Louisiana, United States. The locations of National Register properties and districts for which the latitude and longitude coordinates are included below, may be seen in a map.

There are 43 properties and districts listed on the National Register in the parish.

This National Park Service list is complete through NPS recent listings posted May 1, 2026.

== Current listings ==
	Name on the Register	Image	Date listed	Location	City or town	Description
1	Alesia		March 14, 1983 (#83000514)	108 North Morgan Avenue; 30°08′55″N 91°57′49″W	Broussard	
2	Louis J. and Marie Amelia Arceneaux House		October 11, 2022 (#100008285)	134 Rose Ln. 30°17′33″N 92°01′58″W	Lafayette	
3	Bank of Scott	Bank of Scott	September 19, 2016 (#16000671)	1102 Saint Mary Street; 30°14′09″N 92°05′41″W	Scott	
4	Billeaud House		March 14, 1983 (#83000515)	303 West Main Street; 30°08′53″N 91°57′59″W	Broussard	
5	Martial Billeaud Jr. House		March 14, 1983 (#83000516)	118 North Morgan Avenue; 30°08′56″N 91°57′50″W	Broussard	
6	Brandt House	Brandt House	June 20, 2002 (#02000654)	614 Madison St. 30°13′39″N 92°01′12″W	Lafayette	
7	Valsin Broussard House		March 14, 1983 (#83000517)	408 West Main Street; 30°08′57″N 91°58′02″W	Broussard	
8	Camp Claiborne Regimental Chapel	Camp Claiborne Regimental Chapel	July 31, 2023 (#100009215)	710 Jefferson Blvd. 30°13′49″N 92°00′31″W	Lafayette	
9	Comeaux House		March 14, 1983 (#83000518)	101 East 2nd Street; 30°09′05″N 91°57′41″W	Broussard	
10	Daigle House		June 14, 1984 (#84001298)	1012 South Washington Street; 30°13′21″N 92°01′20″W	Lafayette	A Creole cottage, built c.1880 in Greek Revival style.
11	Downtown Lafayette Civic Center		October 16, 2019 (#100004510)	705 Jefferson St., 731 Jefferson St., 735 Jefferson St., 124 E. Main St. 30°13′22″N 92°01′07″W	Lafayette	
12	Ducrest Building	Ducrest Building	March 14, 1983 (#83000519)	100 West Main Street; 30°08′54″N 91°57′51″W	Broussard	
13	Dupleix House		October 4, 1984 (#84000013)	106 Lafayette Street; 30°05′56″N 91°59′24″W	Youngsville	
14	Elrose	Elrose	June 14, 1984 (#84001305)	217 West University Avenue; 30°13′05″N 92°01′15″W	Lafayette	
15	Evangeline Hotel	Evangeline Hotel	March 17, 1994 (#94000235)	302 Jefferson Street; 30°13′38″N 92°01′01″W	Lafayette	
16	First United Methodist Church	First United Methodist Church	June 21, 1984 (#84001307)	703 Lee Avenue; 30°13′21″N 92°01′02″W	Lafayette	
17	Freetown-Port Rico Historic District		February 2, 2016 (#15000694)	Roughly bounded by East University Avenue, Lee Avenue, Garfield Street, Taft Street, Drain Street, East Pinhook Road, Guidry Street, Refinery Street, Lucille Avenue, Jefferson Street and Coolidge Street; 30°13′05″N 92°00′52″W	Lafayette	
18	Gordon Hotel	Gordon Hotel	June 25, 1982 (#82002778)	100-110 East Vermilion Street; 30°13′26″N 92°01′07″W	Lafayette	
19	Holy Rosary Institute	Holy Rosary Institute	December 3, 1980 (#80001734)	421 Carmel Street; 30°14′07″N 91°59′52″W	Lafayette	
20	Hope Lodge No. 145	Hope Lodge No. 145	January 21, 1983 (#83000520)	116 East Vermilion Street; 30°13′26″N 92°01′05″W	Lafayette	
21	Janin Store		March 14, 1983 (#83000521)	123 North Morgan Avenue; 30°08′59″N 91°57′49″W	Broussard	
22	Lafayette Central Business District	Lafayette Central Business District	October 13, 2020 (#100005680)	Roughly bounded by East Cypress, Polk, Barry, Lafayette, West Garfield and South Buchanan Sts., Lee Ave., Rue Bibliotheque, and the RR. 30°13′27″N 92°01′00″W	Lafayette	
23	Lafayette Coca-Cola Bottling Plant		October 16, 2018 (#100003025)	1506 Cameron St. 30°13′56″N 92°01′53″W	Lafayette	
24	Lafayette Elementary School		June 14, 1984 (#84001308)	1301 West University Avenue; 30°13′29″N 92°01′41″W	Lafayette	
25	Lafayette Hardware Store	Lafayette Hardware Store	June 14, 1984 (#84001309)	121 West Vermilion Street; 30°13′26″N 92°01′11″W	Lafayette	
26	Alexandre Latiolais House		May 9, 1985 (#85000972)	900 East Butcher Switch Road; 30°17′10″N 92°00′02″W	Lafayette	
27	Main Street Historic District		March 14, 1983 (#83000522)	203-305 East Main Street; 30°08′52″N 91°57′44″W	Broussard	
28	Sidney Martin House		November 8, 1984 (#84000351)	310 Sidney Martin Road; 30°16′42″N 92°00′45″W	Lafayette	
29	Mills, Kennedy, and Hopkins Additions		January 24, 2025 (#100009214)	Generally bounded by RR tracks, West 2nd, West Congress, and South St. Antoine Sts. 30°13′46″N 92°01′19″W	Lafayette	
30	Alexandre Mouton House	Alexandre Mouton House	June 18, 1975 (#75000850)	1122 Lafayette Street; 30°13′15″N 92°01′16″W	Lafayette	
31	Charles H. Mouton House	Charles H. Mouton House	June 9, 1980 (#80001735)	338 North Sterling Street; 30°13′56″N 92°00′36″W	Lafayette	Also part of Sterling Grove Historic District since its creation on July 26, 1984.
32	Oil Center Historic District		December 23, 2020 (#100005941)	Roughly bounded by East St. Mary Blvd., West Pinhook Rd., Travis St., Heyman and Audubon Blvds., Harding and Coolidge Sts. 30°12′23″N 92°00′51″W	Lafayette	
33	Old Guaranty Bank Building		July 12, 1984 (#84001311)	500 Jefferson Street; 30°13′33″N 92°01′07″W	Lafayette	
34	Old Lafayette City Hall	Old Lafayette City Hall	June 10, 1975 (#75000851)	217 West Main Street; 30°13′21″N 92°01′14″W	Lafayette	
35	Our Lady of the Assumption School	Our Lady of the Assumption School	November 29, 2001 (#01001267)	410 North Michaud Street; 30°19′33″N 92°02′34″W	Carencro	
36	J. Arthur Roy House		June 14, 1984 (#84001314)	1204 Johnston Street; 30°13′03″N 92°01′11″W	Lafayette	
37	Roy-LeBlanc House	Roy-LeBlanc House	March 14, 1983 (#83000523)	105 South St. Pierre Street; 30°08′52″N 91°57′54″W	Broussard	
38	St. Cecilia School		March 14, 1983 (#83000524)	302 West Main Street; 30°08′56″N 91°57′58″W	Broussard	
39	St. John's Cathedral	St. John's Cathedral	July 27, 1979 (#79001067)	515 Cathedral Street; also 914 St. John Street; 30°13′22″N 92°01′25″W	Lafayette	A boundary increase was approved January 25, 2024.
40	St. Julien House		March 14, 1983 (#83000525)	203 East 2nd Street; 30°09′03″N 91°57′39″W	Broussard	
41	Sterling Grove Historic District		July 26, 1984 (#84001320)	Roughly bounded by Evangeline Throughway, East Simcoe Street, North Sterling Street and Chopin Street; 30°13′58″N 92°00′39″W	Lafayette	
42	Trappey's Cannery		October 7, 2022 (#100008269)	501 Guidry St. 30°12′49″N 92°00′10″W	Lafayette	
43	Vermilion Inn	Vermilion Inn	July 13, 1983 (#83000526)	1304 Pinhook Road; 30°12′02″N 92°00′59″W	Lafayette	

== Former listings ==
	Name on the Register	Image	Date listed	Date removed	Location	City or town	Description
1	Salles House and Office		July 19, 1984 (#84001316)	June 12, 2017	512-514 South Buchanan Street; 30°13′34″N 92°01′10″W	Lafayette	Buildings delisted after being moved to Acadian Village, about 5.6 miles (9.0 km) to the southwest.

== See also ==
- Armand Broussard House: listed in Iberia Parish but later relocated to Lafayette Parish
- List of National Historic Landmarks in Louisiana
- National Register of Historic Places listings in Louisiana
