= Janin Store =

- U.S. National Register of Historic Places
- Location within Louisiana Location within the United States
- Location: 123 North Morgan Avenue, Broussard, Louisiana
- Coordinates: 30°08′59″N 91°57′49″W
- Built: c.1890
- Built by: Francois Janin
- Architectural style: Italianate
- MPS: Broussard MRA
- NRHP reference No.: 83000521
- Added to NRHP: March 14, 1983

Janin Store, also known as the Old Janin Store, is a historic commercial building located at 123 North Morgan Avenue in Broussard, Louisiana, United States.

Built c.1890 by Francois Janin, the structure is an Italianate style one-and-a-half story frame commercial building. The store was run by the Janin family until late 1960s.

The building was listed on the National Register of Historic Places on March 14, 1983.

It is one of 10 individually NRHP-listed properties in the "Broussard Multiple Resource Area", which also includes:

- Alesia House
- Billeaud House
- Martial Billeaud Jr. House
- Valsin Broussard House
- Comeaux House
- Ducrest Building
- Roy-LeBlanc House
- St. Cecilia School
- St. Julien House
- Main Street Historic District

== See also ==
- National Register of Historic Places listings in Lafayette Parish, Louisiana
