= Alesia (Broussard, Louisiana) =

Historic house in Louisiana, United States

- U.S. National Register of Historic Places
- Location within Louisiana Location within the United States
- Location: 108 North Morgan Avenue, Broussard, Louisiana
- Coordinates: 30°08′55″N 91°57′49″W
- Area: 0.2 acres (0.081 ha)
- Built: c.1900
- Built by: Herbert Billeaud
- Architectural style: Stick/Eastlake, Queen Anne
- MPS: Broussard MRA
- NRHP reference No.: 83000514
- Added to NRHP: March 14, 1983

Alesia is a historic house located at 108 North Morgan Avenue in Broussard, Louisiana.

Built c.1900 by Herbert Billeaud for his wife Alice, the house is a large Queen Anne style frame cottage ornated by a Colonial Revival gallery with double columns.

The house was listed on the National Register of Historic Places on March 14, 1983.

It is one of 10 individually NRHP-listed houses in the "Broussard Multiple Resource Area", which also includes:

- Billeaud House
- Martial Billeaud Jr. House
- Valsin Broussard House
- Comeaux House
- Ducrest Building
- Janin Store
- Roy-LeBlanc House
- St. Cecilia School
- St. Julien House
- Main Street Historic District

== See also ==
- National Register of Historic Places listings in Lafayette Parish, Louisiana
