= Freetown-Port Rico Historic District =

Historic district in Louisiana, United States

- U.S. National Register of Historic Places
- U.S. Historic district
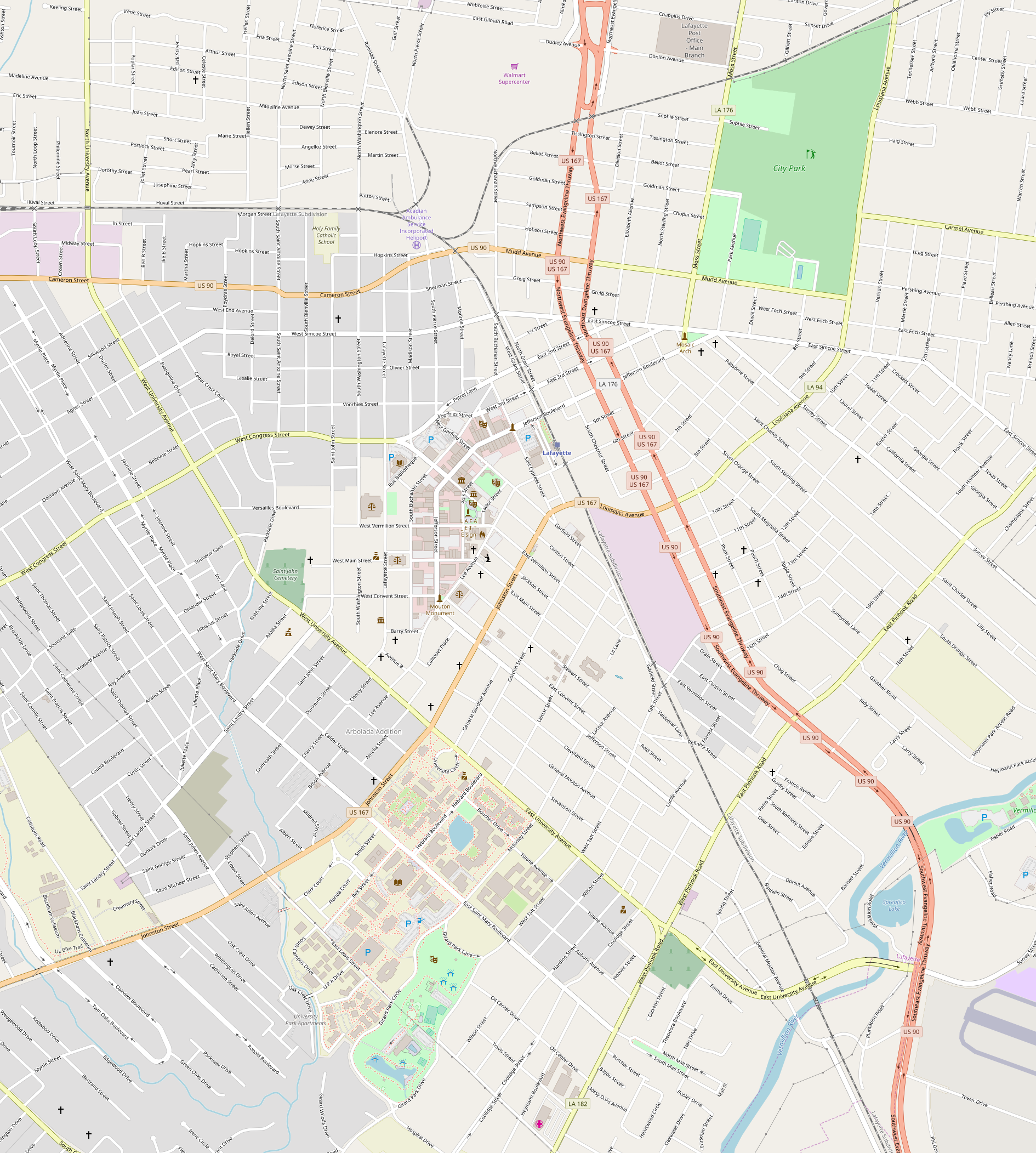
- Location within Lafayette

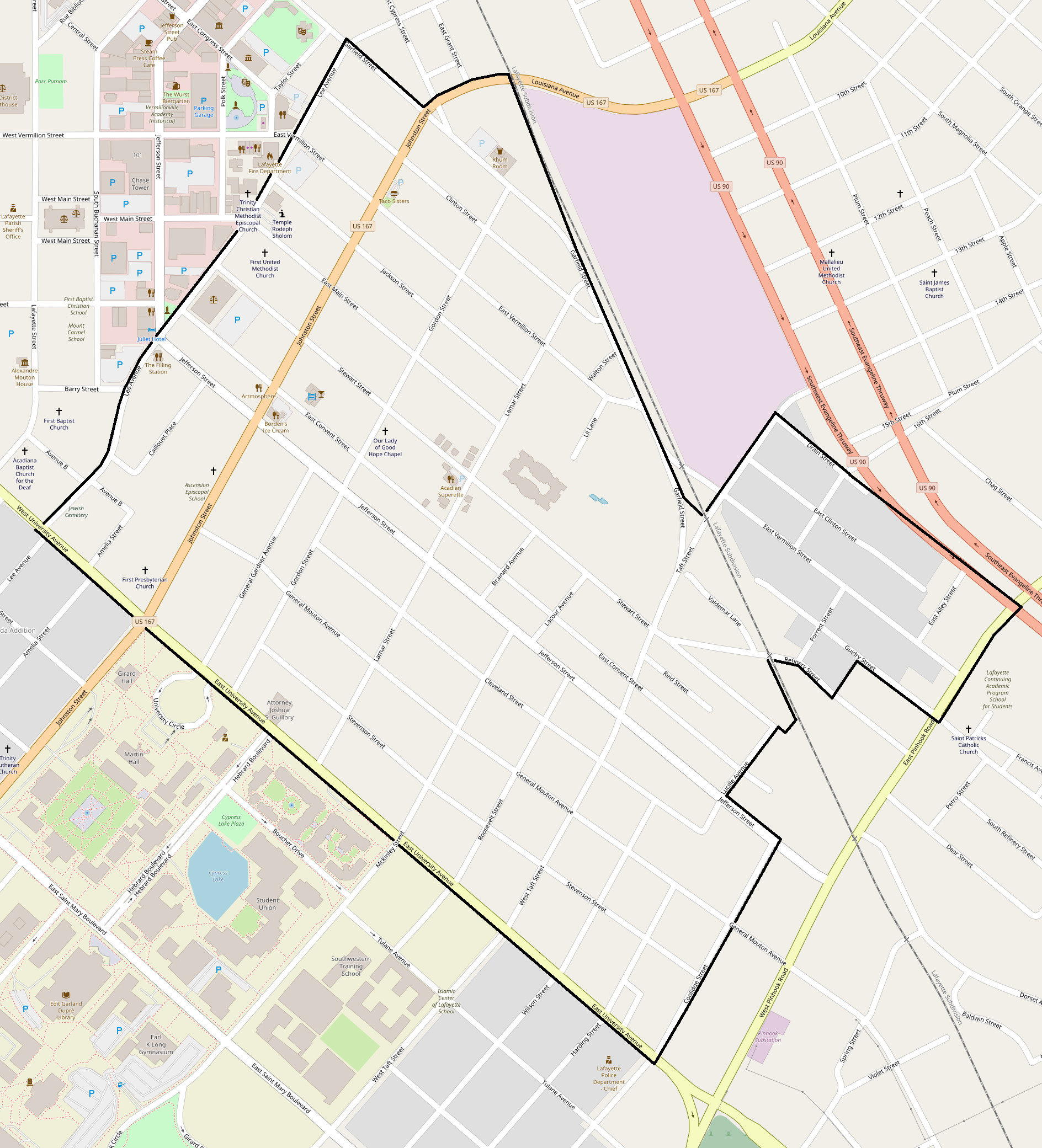
- Location: Roughly bounded by East University Avenue, Lee Avenue, Garfield Street, Taft Street, Drain Street, East Pinhook Road, Guidry Street, Refinery Street, Lucille Avenue, Jefferson Street and Coolidge Street, Lafayette, Louisiana
- Coordinates: 30°13′05″N 92°00′52″W
- Area: 220 acres (89 ha)
- NRHP reference No.: 15000694
- Added to NRHP: February 2, 2016

The Freetown-Port Rico Historic District is a historic district located in downtown Lafayette, Louisiana.

The 220-acre area included 677 contributing buildings and 197 non-contributing buildings, as well as one contributing structure. The district comprises residential, commercial and institutional buildings with styles typical of late 19th to early 20th century southern towns, including Folk Victorian, Colonial Revival, Neo-classical Revival, Tudor Revival, Eclectic, Bungalow/Craftsman, Minimal Traditional, Ranch and Commercial.

The area includes some properties associated with Southwestern Louisiana Institute (SLI), a school founded in 1900 which later became the University of Louisiana at Lafayette. Despite being inside the area, the individually listed First United Methodist Church is not considered part of the historic district.

The district was listed on the National Register of Historic Places on February 2, 2016.

== See also ==
- National Register of Historic Places listings in Lafayette Parish, Louisiana
