= Main Street Historic District (Broussard, Louisiana) =

Historic district in Louisiana, United States

- U.S. National Register of Historic Places
- U.S. Historic district
- Location within Louisiana Location within the United States
- Location: 203-305 East Main Street, Broussard, Louisiana
- Coordinates: 30°08′52″N 91°57′44″W
- MPS: Broussard MRA
- NRHP reference No.: 83000522
- Added to NRHP: March 14, 1983

The Main Street Historic District is a historic district located along East Main Street in Broussard, Louisiana, United States.

The district comprises five contributing properties dating from c.1890 to c.1910:

- Andre Billeaud House, at 203 East Main Street, 30°08′53″N 91°57′46″W, built in 1903 by Andre Billeaud.
- Bernard Building, at 211 East Main Street, 30°08′52″N 91°57′44″W, built in 1902 by Mr. Guilliam Bernard.
- Bobby's Lounge, at 305 East Main Street, 30°08′52″N 91°57′42″W, built c.1910. Facade seem to have been altered since the time of listing.
- Paul Billeaud Home, at 302 East Main Street, 30°08′51″N 91°57′43″W, built 1911 by Paul Billeaud.
- Old Comeaux Home, at 208 East Main Street, 30°08′51″N 91°57′45″W, built 1910 by Mr. Alphonse Comeaux. The structure is listed as Hub City Bank after the owner at the moment of enlistment.

The district was listed on the National Register of Historic Places on March 14, 1983.

The historic district is also one of the properties included in the "Broussard Multiple Resource Area", which includes:

- Alesia House
- Billeaud House
- Martial Billeaud Jr. House
- Valsin Broussard House
- Comeaux House
- Ducrest Building
- Janin Store
- Roy-LeBlanc House
- St. Cecilia School
- St. Julien House

== See also ==
- National Register of Historic Places listings in Lafayette Parish, Louisiana
