= Valsin Broussard House =

Historic house in Louisiana, United States

- U.S. National Register of Historic Places
- Location within Louisiana Location within the United States
- Location: 408 West Main Street, Broussard, Louisiana
- Coordinates: 30°08′57″N 91°58′02″W
- Area: less than one acre
- Built: c.1876
- Built by: Valsin Broussard
- Architectural style: Creole
- MPS: Broussard MRA
- NRHP reference No.: 83000517
- Added to NRHP: March 14, 1983

The Valsin Broussard House is a historic house located at 408 West Main Street in Broussard, Louisiana.

Built c.1876 by Valsin Broussard, founder of the town of Broussard, the house is the oldest remaining residence in the town. The Creole two-story frame house with a frontend gallery was modified in c.1900 with the addition of the rear wing.

The house was listed on the National Register of Historic Places on March 14, 1983.

It is one of 10 individually NRHP-listed houses in the "Broussard Multiple Resource Area", which also includes:

- Alesia House
- Billeaud House
- Martial Billeaud Jr. House
- Comeaux House
- Ducrest Building
- Janin Store
- Roy-LeBlanc House
- St. Cecilia School
- St. Julien House
- Main Street Historic District

== See also ==
- National Register of Historic Places listings in Lafayette Parish, Louisiana
