= Roy-LeBlanc House =

Historic house in Louisiana, United States

- U.S. National Register of Historic Places
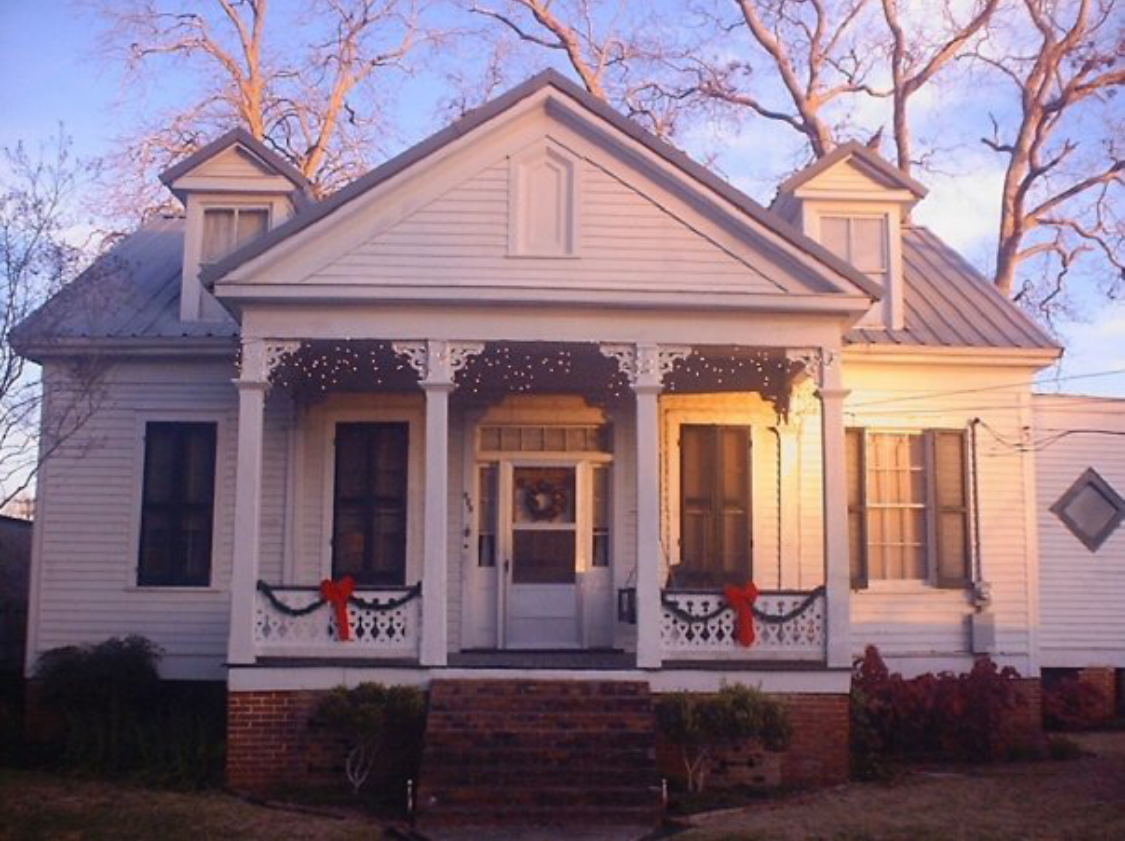
- The house in 2018

- Location within Louisiana Location within the United States
- Location: 105 South St. Pierre Street, Broussard, Louisiana
- Coordinates: 30°08′52″N 91°57′54″W
- Built: 1886
- Built by: Joseph Arthur Roy
- Architectural style: Italianate
- MPS: Broussard MRA
- NRHP reference No.: 83000523
- Added to NRHP: March 14, 1983

The Roy-LeBlanc House is a historic house located at 105 South St. Pierre Street in Broussard, Louisiana, United States.

Built in 1886 by Joseph Arthur Roy for his wife Cornelia Bailey, the house is a frame one-and-a-half story Italianate house with two front dormers. The house was sold to J.G. LeBlanc in 1889.

The building was listed on the National Register of Historic Places on March 14, 1983.

It is one of 10 individually NRHP-listed houses in the "Broussard Multiple Resource Area", which also includes:

- Alesia House
- Billeaud House
- Martial Billeaud Jr. House
- Valsin Broussard House
- Comeaux House
- Ducrest Building
- Janin Store
- St. Cecilia School
- St. Julien House
- Main Street Historic District

== See also ==
- National Register of Historic Places listings in Lafayette Parish, Louisiana
