= St. Julien House =

Historical building

- U.S. National Register of Historic Places
- Location within Louisiana Location within the United States
- Location: 203 East 2nd Street, Broussard, Louisiana
- Coordinates: 30°09′02″N 91°57′39″W
- Built: c.1910
- Built by: Mrs. Marguerite Helena Roy St. Julien
- Architectural style: Colonial Revival, Queen Anne
- MPS: Broussard MRA
- NRHP reference No.: 83000525
- Added to NRHP: March 14, 1983

The St. Julien House was a historic house located at 203 East 2nd Street in Broussard, Louisiana, United States.

Built in c.1910 by Mrs. Marguerite Helena Roy St. Julien, widow of Gustave St. Julien, the house is a 1 1/2-story building in Queen Anne-Colonial Revival style, which was built as a copy of the nearby Comeaux House except for the turret and the cupola. Like the building it was replicating, the house was converted to a restaurant in 1979 with small alterations which did not affect its main architectural features.

The building was listed on the National Register of Historic Places on March 14, 1983.

It is one of 10 individually NRHP-listed houses in the "Broussard Multiple Resource Area", which also includes:

- Alesia House
- Billeaud House
- Martial Billeaud Jr. House
- Valsin Broussard House
- Comeaux House
- Ducrest Building
- Janin Store
- Roy-LeBlanc House
- St. Cecilia School
- Main Street Historic District

== See also ==
- National Register of Historic Places listings in Lafayette Parish, Louisiana
