= Comeaux House =

Historic house in Louisiana, United States

- U.S. National Register of Historic Places
- Location within Louisiana Location within the United States
- Location: 101 East 2nd Street, Broussard, Louisiana
- Coordinates: 30°09′05″N 91°57′41″W
- Built: c.1908
- Built by: Edmond Comeaux
- Architectural style: Colonial Revival, Queen Anne
- MPS: Broussard MRA
- NRHP reference No.: 83000518
- Added to NRHP: March 14, 1983

The Comeaux House is a historic house located at 101 East 2nd Street in Broussard, Louisiana, United States.

Built in c.1908 by Edmond Comeaux and his wife Cecile St. Julien Comeaux, the house is a Queen Anne-Colonial Revival style residence with semi-octagonal bay at each end of the facade, a semi-octagonal Doric front gallery and a corner turret. The building was converted to a restaurant with small alterations which did not affect its main architectural features.

The building was listed on the National Register of Historic Places on March 14, 1983.

The structure is actually hosting Nash's Restaurant.

It is one of ten individually NRHP-listed houses in the "Broussard Multiple Resource Area", which also includes:

- Alesia House
- Billeaud House
- Martial Billeaud Jr. House
- Valsin Broussard House
- Ducrest Building
- Janin Store
- Roy-LeBlanc House
- St. Cecilia School
- St. Julien House
- Main Street Historic District

== See also ==
- National Register of Historic Places listings in Lafayette Parish, Louisiana
