= St. Cecilia School (Broussard, Louisiana) =

- U.S. National Register of Historic Places
- Location within Louisiana Location within the United States
- Location: 302 West Main Street, Broussard, Louisiana
- Coordinates: 30°08′56″N 91°57′58″W
- Built: 1909
- Architectural style: Italianate
- MPS: Broussard MRA
- NRHP reference No.: 83000524
- Added to NRHP: March 14, 1983

St. Cecilia School is a historic school building located at 302 West Main Street in Broussard, Louisiana, United States.

Built in 1909, the school is a three-story Italianate brick building featuring arched windows and a large front dormer.

The building was listed on the National Register of Historic Places on March 14, 1983.

It is one of 10 individually NRHP-listed buildings in the "Broussard Multiple Resource Area", which also includes:

- Alesia House
- Billeaud House
- Martial Billeaud Jr. House
- Valsin Broussard House
- Comeaux House
- Ducrest Building
- Janin Store
- Roy-LeBlanc House
- St. Julien House
- Main Street Historic District

== See also ==
- National Register of Historic Places listings in Lafayette Parish, Louisiana
