= Billeaud House =

Historic house in Louisiana, United States

- U.S. National Register of Historic Places
- Location within Louisiana Location within the United States
- Location: 303 West Main Street, Broussard, Louisiana
- Coordinates: 30°08′53″N 91°57′59″W
- Area: less than one acre
- Built: c.1907
- Built by: Charles Billeaud
- Architectural style: Colonial Revival, Queen Anne
- MPS: Broussard MRA
- NRHP reference No.: 83000515
- Added to NRHP: March 14, 1983

The Billeaud House is a historic house located at 303 West Main Street in Broussard, Louisiana.

Built in c.1907 by Charles Billeaud, the house is a Queen Anne-Colonial Revival style residence with an Ionic front gallery and a semi-octagonal bay. The structure has large decorated dormers on three sides.

It was listed on the National Register of Historic Places in 1983.

It is one of 10 individually NRHP-listed houses in the "Broussard Multiple Resource Area", which also includes:

- Alesia House
- Martial Billeaud Jr. House
- Valsin Broussard House
- Comeaux House
- Ducrest Building
- Janin Store
- Roy-LeBlanc House
- St. Cecilia School
- St. Julien House
- Main Street Historic District

== See also ==
- National Register of Historic Places listings in Lafayette Parish, Louisiana
