= Elrose =

Elrose may refer to:

- Elrose, Saskatchewan, a town in Canada
- Elrose (electoral district), a former provincial electoral district in Saskatchewan
- Elrose (Lafayette, Louisiana), U.S., a historic house
- Elrose Airport, serving the Eloise Copper Mine, Queensland, Australia
