= Le Triomphe Golf Club =

Golf club in Louisiana

Le Triomphe Golf & Country Club
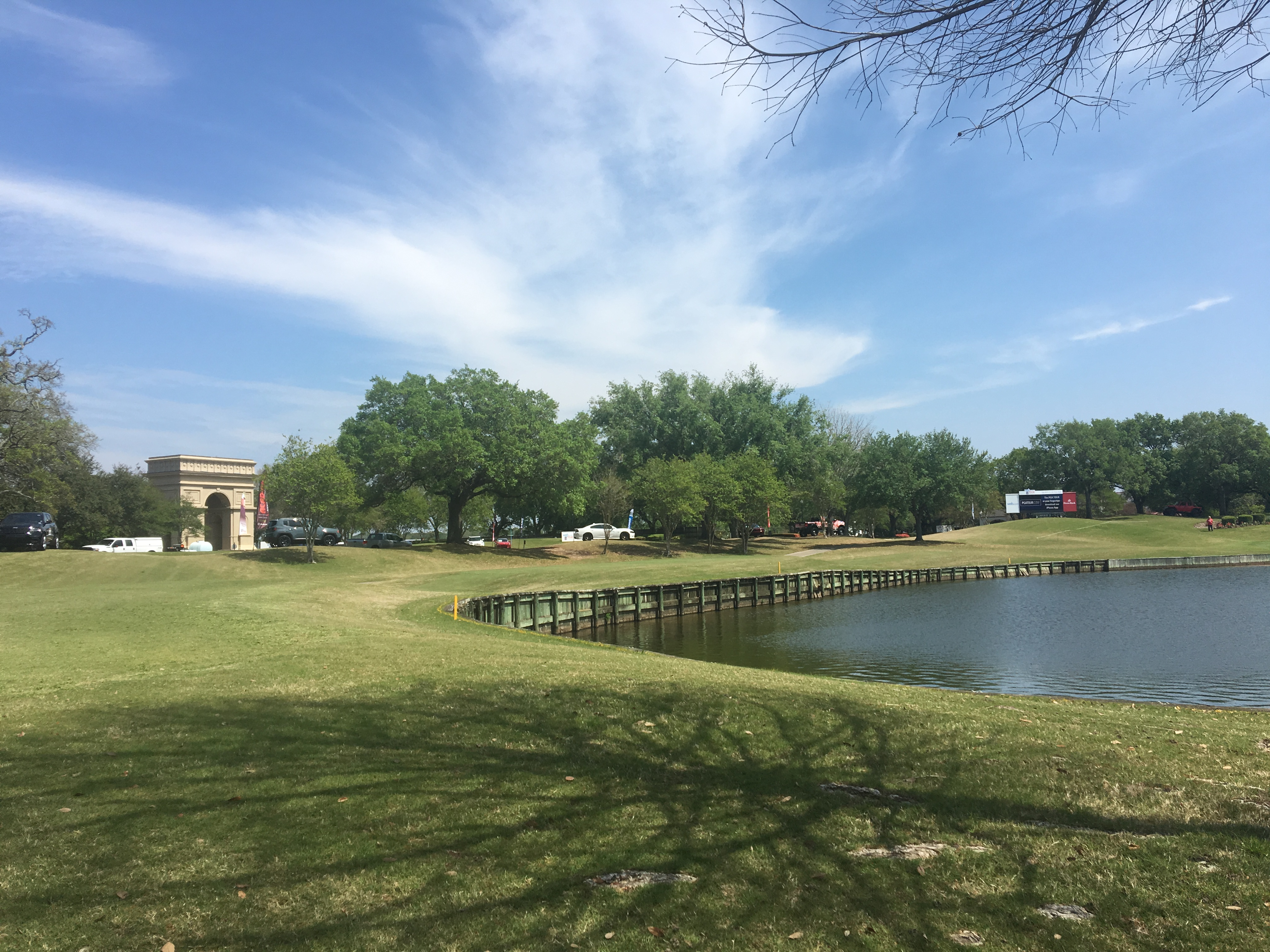
- Interactive map of Le Triomphe Golf & Country Club
- 30°5′36″N 91°56′42″W

Club information
- Location: Broussard, Louisiana
- Established: 1986, 40 years ago
- Type: Private
- Tota holes: 18
- Website: letriomphe.com
- Designed by: Robert Trent Jones Jr.
- Par: 72
- Length: 7,006 yards

Le Triomphe Golf & Country Club is a private golf club in the southeastern United States, located in Broussard, Louisiana. The Chitimacha Louisiana Open is played annually at Le Triomphe. Le Triomphe is one of only two Louisiana courses that hosts a PGA Tour-sanctioned event.

== History ==
Le Triomphe Golf & Country Club was founded in 1986 and designed by Robert Trent Jones Jr. According to USA Today, when it first opened in 1986 it was considered to be one of the best courses built in the United States since 1962. In 1992 Le Triomphe began hosting the Chitimacha Louisiana Open.
