= Sidney Martin House =

Historic house in Louisiana, United States

- U.S. National Register of Historic Places
- Location within Louisiana Location within the United States
- Location: 310 Sidney Martin Road, Lafayette, Louisiana
- Coordinates: 30°16′42″N 92°00′45″W
- Area: 1 acre (0.40 ha)
- Built: c.1835
- Built by: Juan Baptiste Mouton
- NRHP reference No.: 84000351
- Added to NRHP: November 8, 1984

The Sidney Martin House is a historic house located at 310 Sidney Martin Road in Lafayette, Louisiana, United States.

Named after the person who owned the house between 1918 and 1976, the 2 1/2-story classic Creole raised cottage was built in c.1835. Some alterations were made in 1919, the more consistent being the roof line being lowered and the addition of second story columns. Despite 1919 alterations the exterior form of the house is almost intact.

The house was listed on the National Register of Historic Places on November 8, 1984.

== See also ==
- National Register of Historic Places listings in Lafayette Parish, Louisiana
