= J. Arthur Roy House =

Historic house in Louisiana, United States

- U.S. National Register of Historic Places
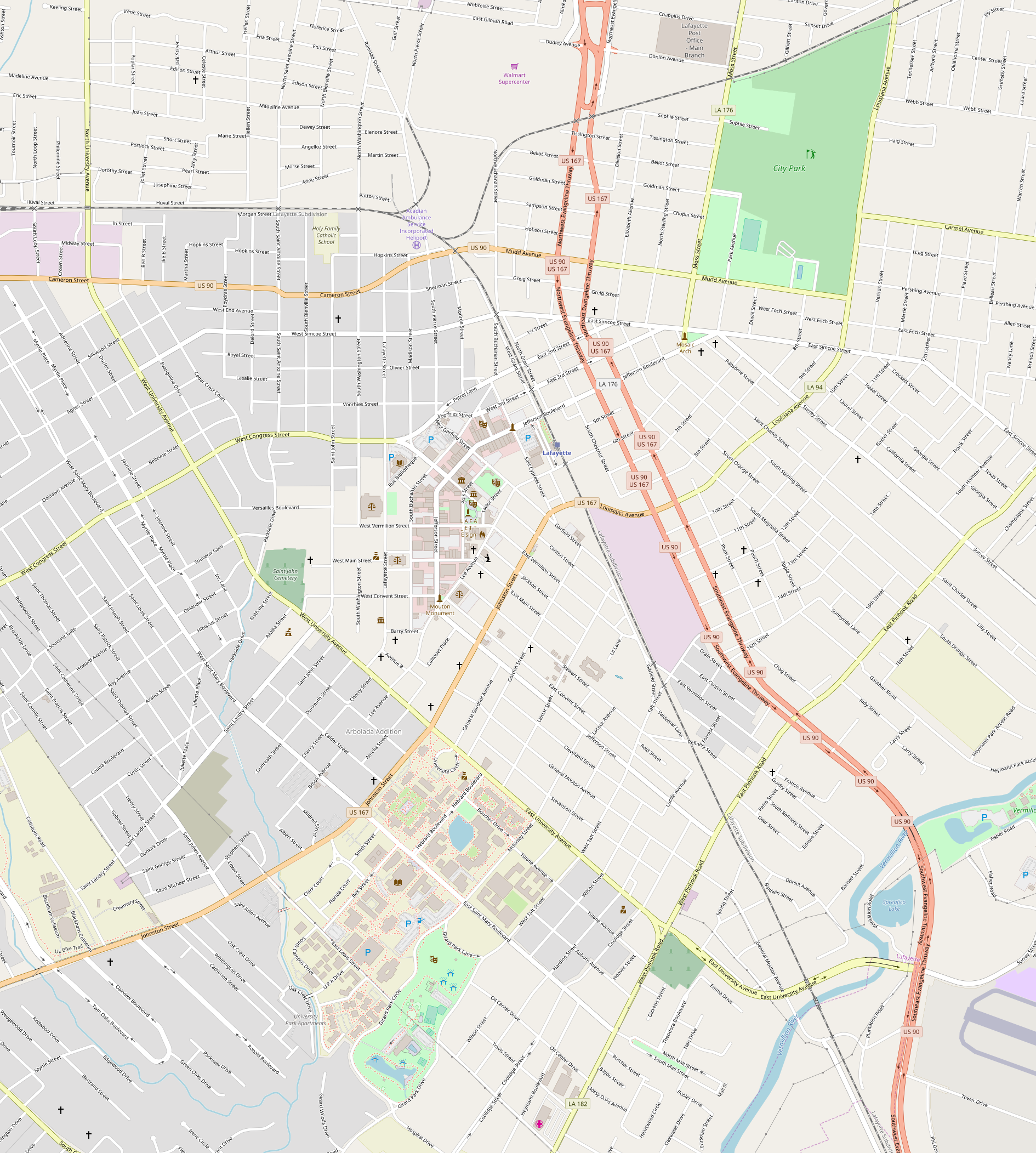
- Location within Lafayette
- Location: 1204 Johnston Street, Lafayette, Louisiana
- Coordinates: 30°13′02″N 92°01′11″W
- Area: 0.75 acres (0.30 ha)
- Built: 1901
- Built by: J. Arthur Roy; George Knapp
- Architect: Arthur Van Dyke
- Architectural style: Queen Anne, Stick-Eastlake
- NRHP reference No.: 84001314
- Added to NRHP: June 14, 1984

J. Arthur Roy House is a historic house located at 1204 Johnston Street in Lafayette, Louisiana, United States. It is currently owned by the University of Louisiana at Lafayette and houses the university publishing company as well as the Center for Louisiana Studies.

Built in 1901 by J. Arthur Roy and designed by Arthur Van Dyke, the house is a two-story frame in Queen Anne and Stick-Eastlake style, with a two-story front gallery and a single story side gallery featuring Eastlake columns.

The house was listed on the National Register of Historic Places on June 14, 1984.

== See also ==
- National Register of Historic Places listings in Lafayette Parish, Louisiana
