= Evangeline Hotel =

- U.S. National Register of Historic Places
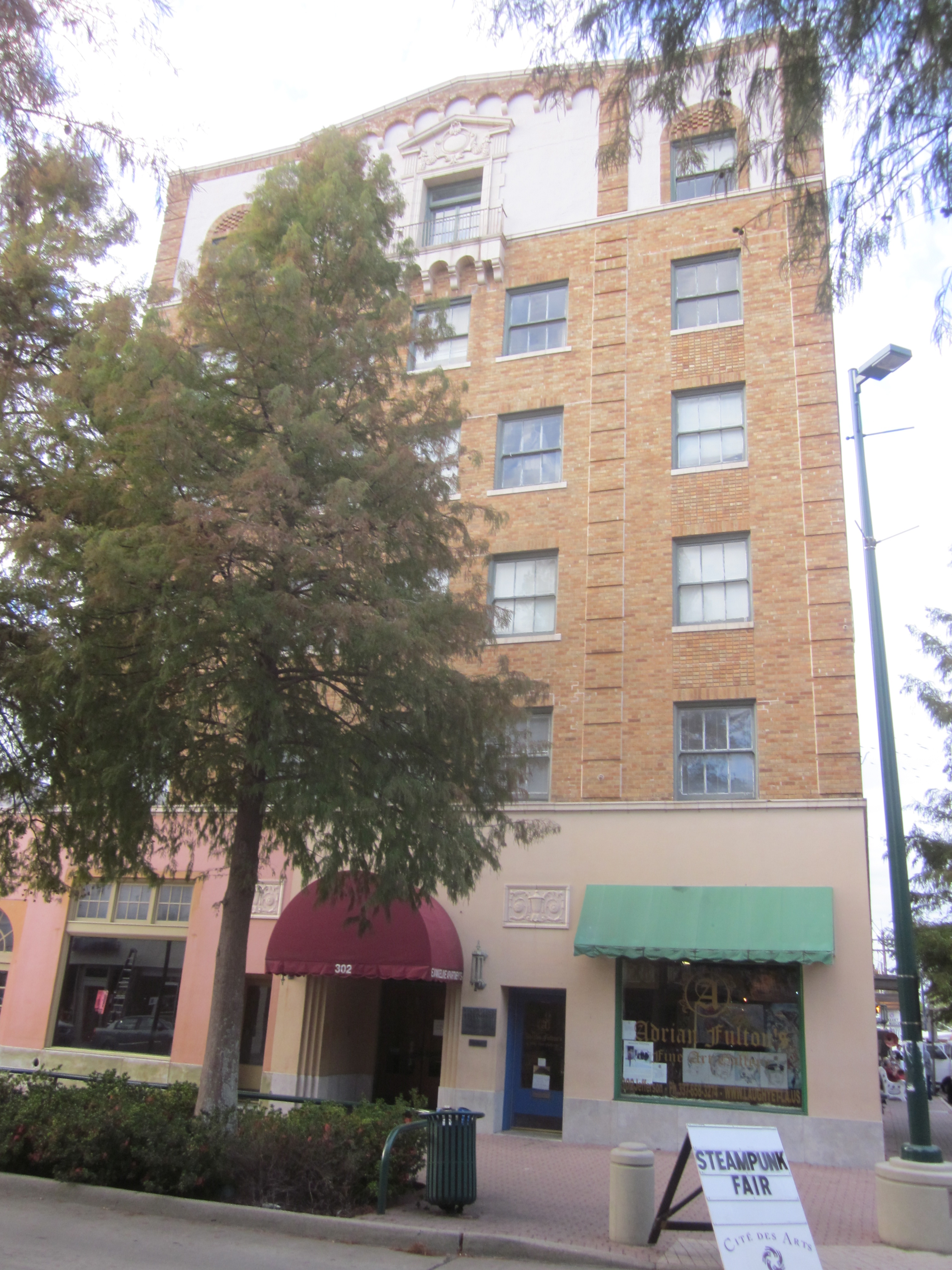

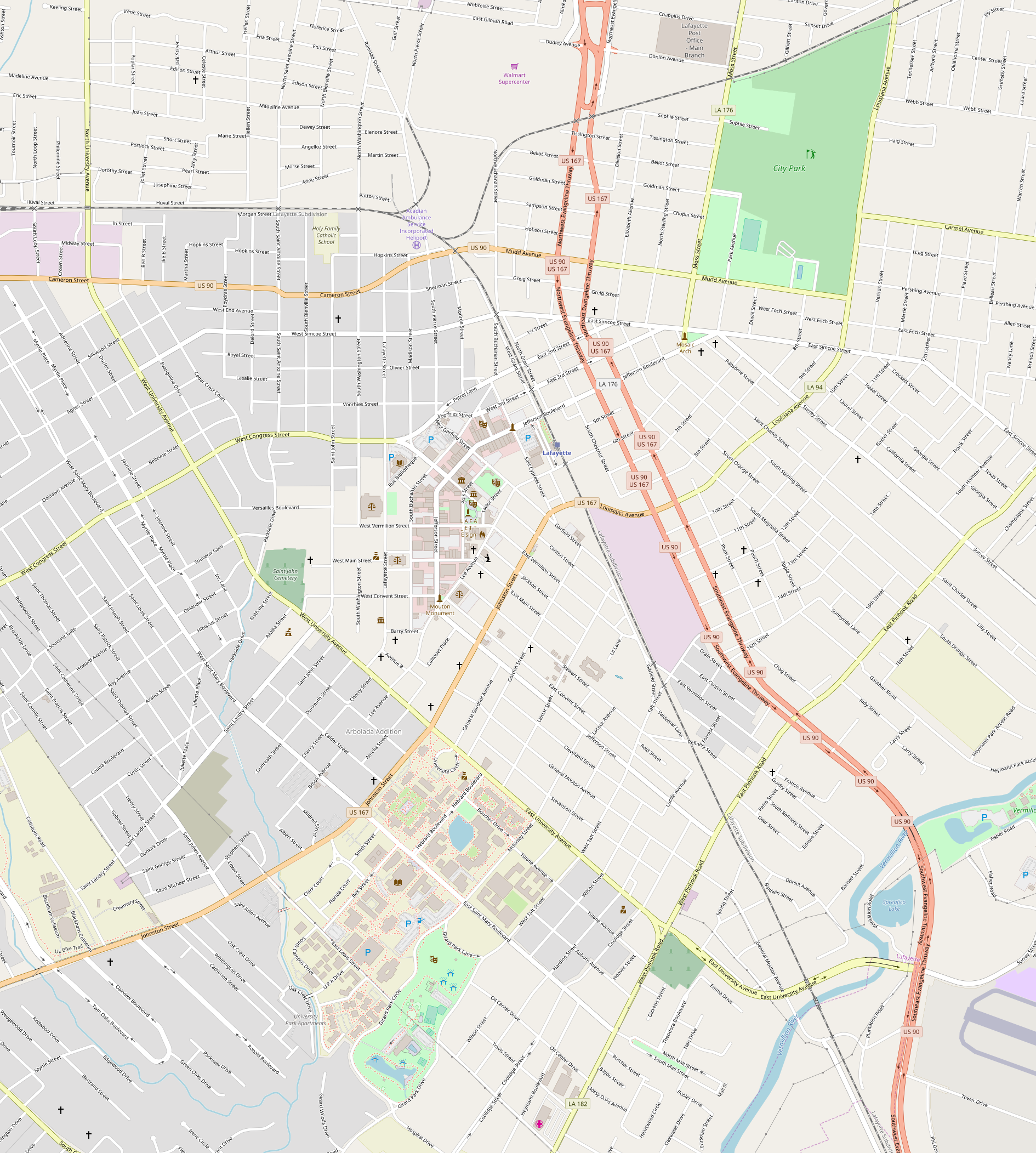
- Location within Lafayette
- Location: 302 and 302A Jefferson Street, Lafayette, Louisiana
- Coordinates: 30°13′38″N 92°01′01″W
- Area: 0.59 acres (0.24 ha)
- Built: 1928
- Architectural style: Italianate
- NRHP reference No.: 94000235
- Added to NRHP: March 17, 1994

The Evangeline Hotel is a historic hotel and restaurant building located at 302 and 302A Jefferson Street in Lafayette, Louisiana, United States.

Built in 1928, the hotel is a large six story brick building with a one-story restaurant wing in Italianate style.

The building was listed on the National Register of Historic Places on March 17, 1994.

== See also ==
- National Register of Historic Places listings in Lafayette Parish, Louisiana
