= Hope Lodge No. 145 =

- U.S. National Register of Historic Places
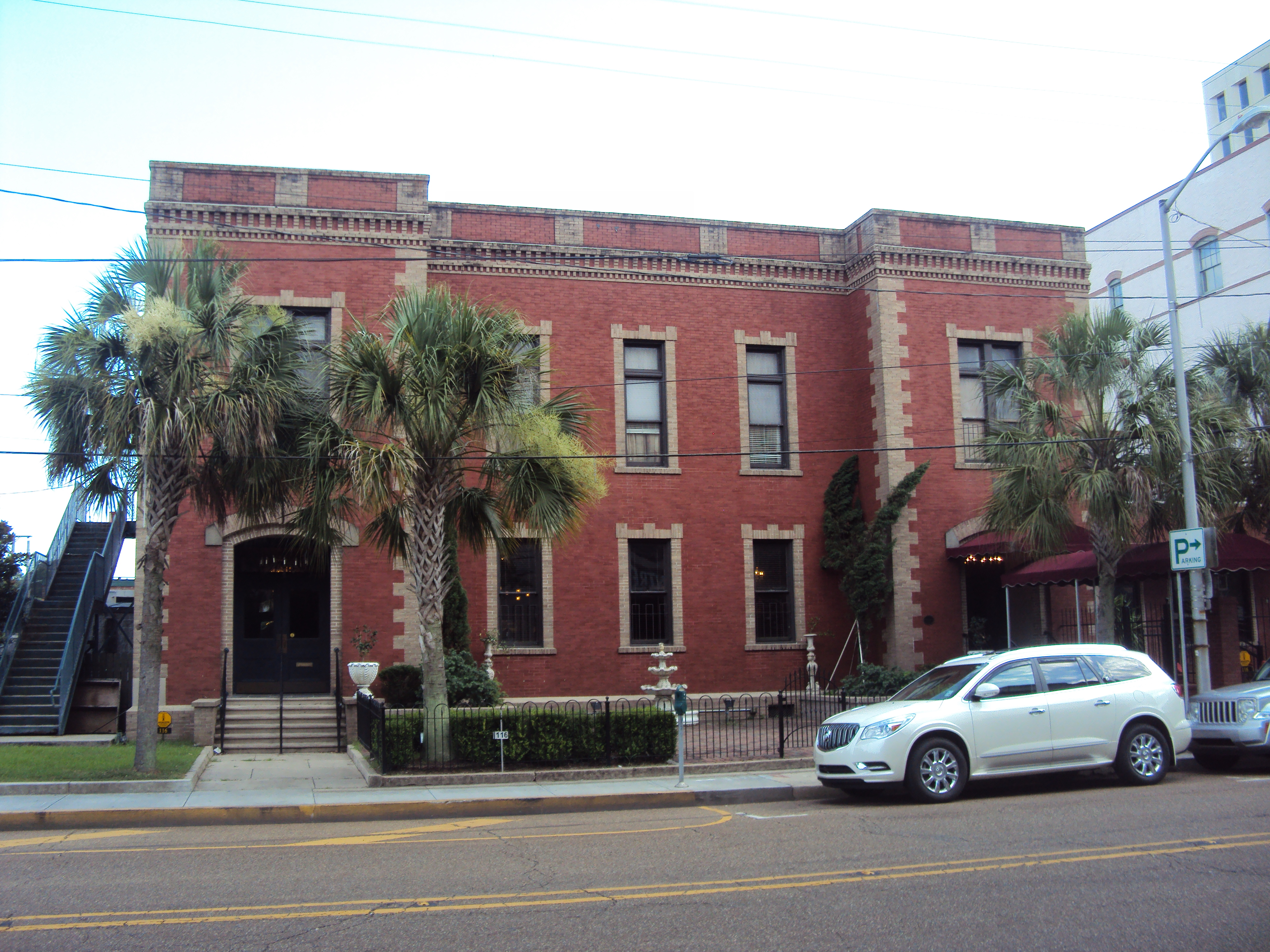

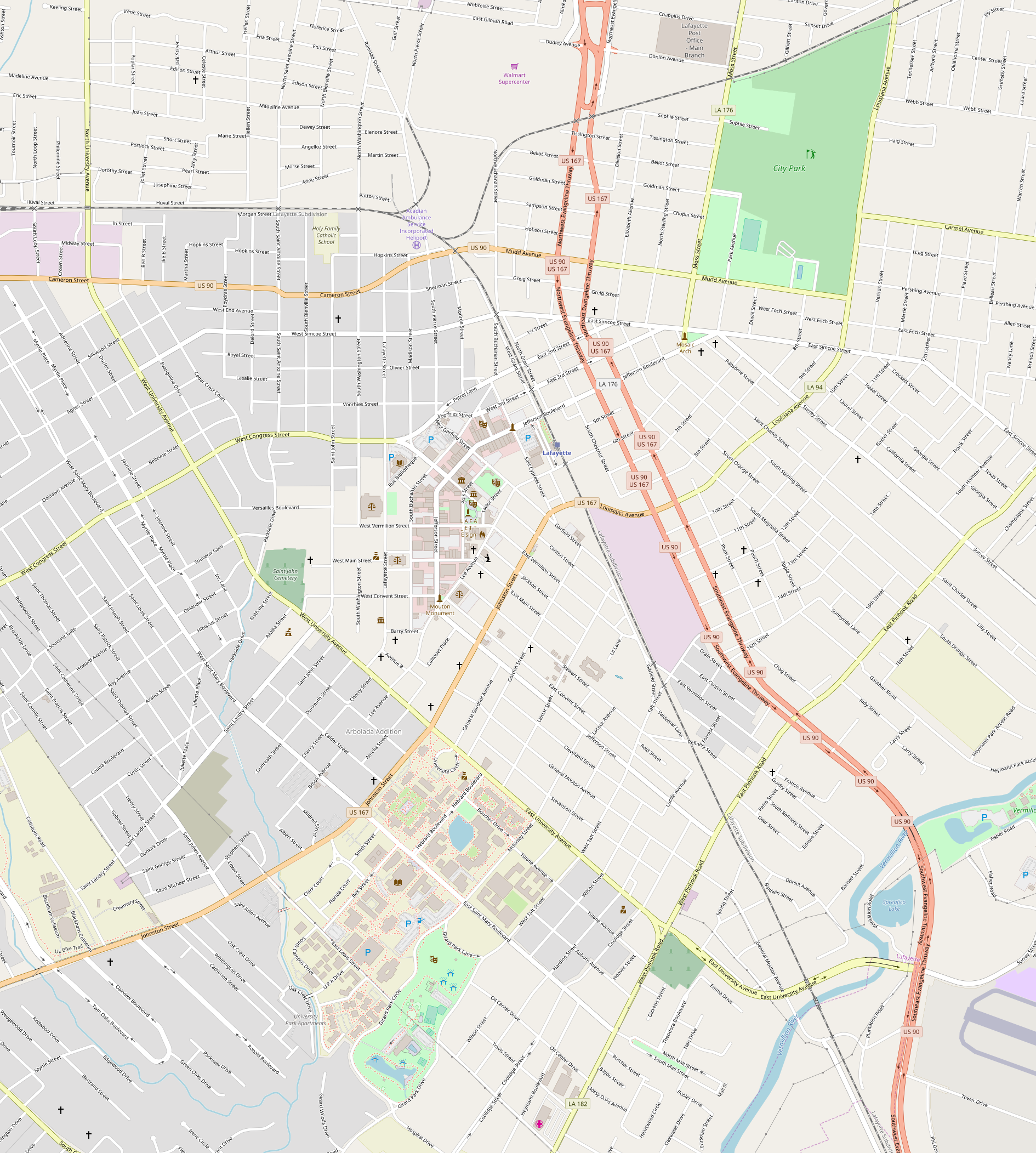
- Location within Lafayette
- Location: 116 East Vermilion Street, Lafayette, Louisiana
- Coordinates: 30°13′26″N 92°01′05″W
- Area: 0.2 acres (0.081 ha)
- Built: 1916
- Built by: Hope Lodge #145
- Architect: G. B. Knapp
- NRHP reference No.: 83000520
- Added to NRHP: January 21, 1983

The Hope Lodge No. 145 is a historic Freemasons lodge located at 116 East Vermilion Street in Lafayette, Louisiana, United States.

Built in 1916, it is a two-story brick structure with a five-bay facade and a pair of entrances. The lodge was chartered on February 10, 1857. In the same year former Governor Alexandre Mouton donated the site in which the original building was located. In 1916, due to growing membership, the previous building was demolished to make space for the current building.

The building was listed on the National Register of Historic Places on January 21, 1983.

== See also ==
- National Register of Historic Places listings in Lafayette Parish, Louisiana
