= Vermilion Inn =

- U.S. National Register of Historic Places
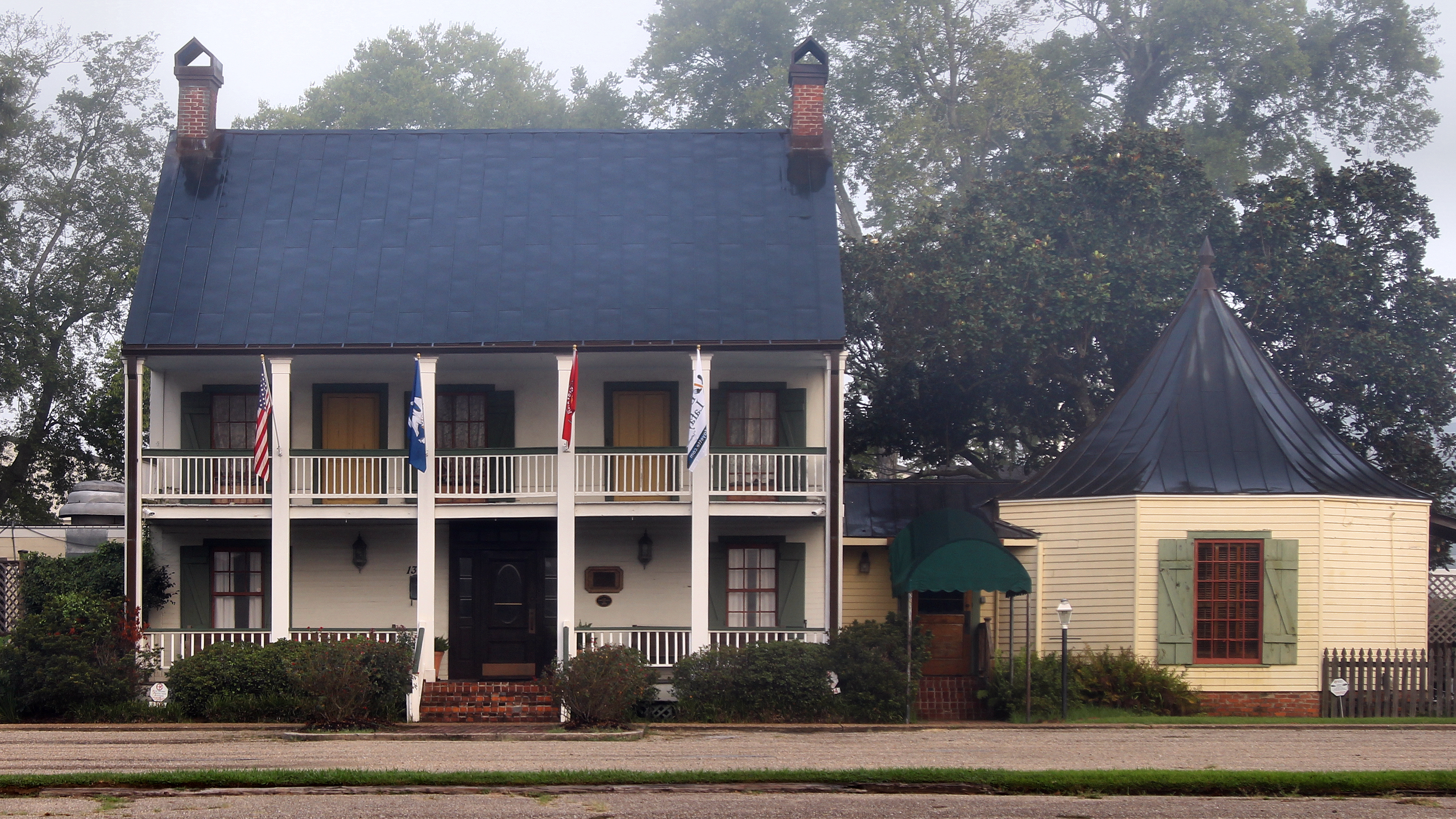

- Location within Louisiana Location within the United States
- Location: 1304 Pinhook Road, Lafayette, Louisiana
- Coordinates: 30°12′02″N 92°00′59″W
- Area: 0.2 acres (0.081 ha)
- Built: c.1835
- Architectural style: Greek Revival
- NRHP reference No.: 83000526
- Added to NRHP: July 13, 1983

The Vermilion Inn, better known as Café Vermilionville, is a historic building located at 1304 Pinhook Road in Lafayette, Louisiana, United States.

Built c.1835, the inn is a two-story Greek Revival structure located near the bank of Vermilion River. Originally in a rural landscape, it's now located in the middle of expanding suburbs of Lafayette. The area where it is located was the site of the Battle of Vermilion Bayou of 1863, at which time the structure was occupied by Union troops.

The building was listed on the National Register of Historic Places on July 13, 1983.

== See also ==
- National Register of Historic Places listings in Lafayette Parish, Louisiana
