= Our Lady of the Assumption School =

Historic church in Louisiana, United States

- U.S. National Register of Historic Places
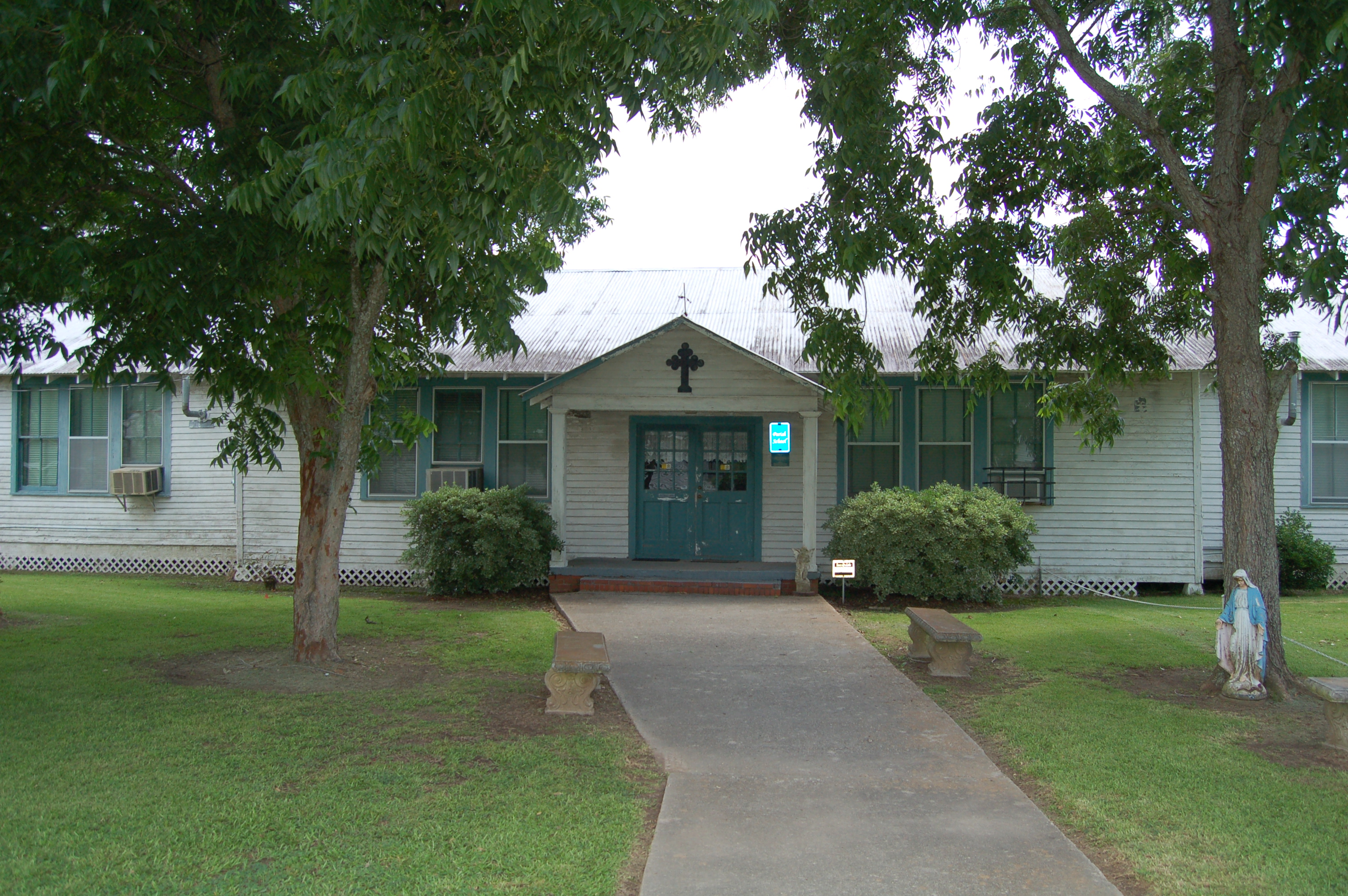

- Location within Louisiana Location within the United States
- Location: 410 North Michaud Street, Carencro, Louisiana
- Coordinates: 30°19′33″N 92°02′34″W
- Area: 3.31 acres (1.34 ha)
- Built: 1934
- NRHP reference No.: 01001267
- Added to NRHP: November 29, 2001

The Our Lady of the Assumption School is a historic Black Catholic school complex located at 410 North Michaud Street in Carencro, Louisiana, United States.

The school complex was listed on the National Register of Historic Places on November 29, 2001.

== History ==
The school building itself was erected in 1934 with funds from St Katharine Drexel, and was roughly doubled in size in 1940, with other additions dating to the 1950s.

The original 1934 building was a small frame rectangular building with a small portico. The interior consisted of a single classroom.

In 1940, two school buildings of three rooms, from a closed school, were attached to the left and to the right of the original one. In 1953, another classroom was added to the rear. In the mid 1950s, a kitchen/cafeteria was added to the south side of the building.

Other three buildings inside the complex are closely related to the school and are considered contributing properties of the 3.31 acres (1.34 ha) historic area:

- Our Lady of the Assumption Catholic Church, 30°19′34″N 92°02′35″W, built in 1925, is a one-story church building featuring a low tower. It was originally a frame structure.
- The church Rectory, 30°19′33″N 92°02′35″W, a one-story frame bungalow which was most probably built at the same time of the church.
- The Convent, 30°19′34″N 92°02′33″W, built in the 1940s, is a one-story frame building which was originally subdivided in small dormitories for nuns. It was specifically built to host school personnel.

== See also ==
- National Register of Historic Places listings in Lafayette Parish, Louisiana
