= Brandt House (Lafayette, Louisiana) =

Historic house in Louisiana, United States

- U.S. National Register of Historic Places
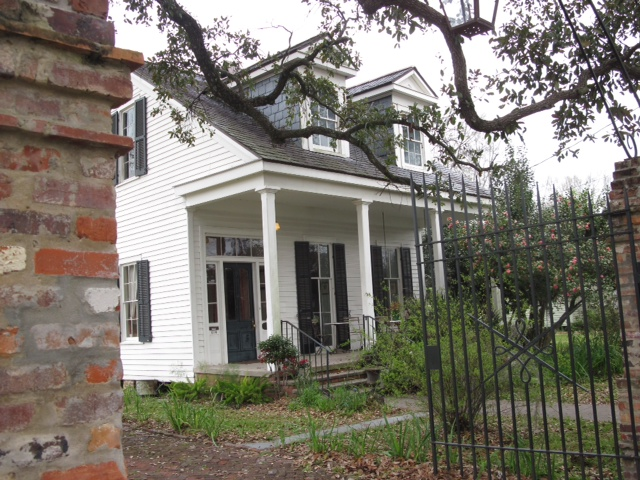

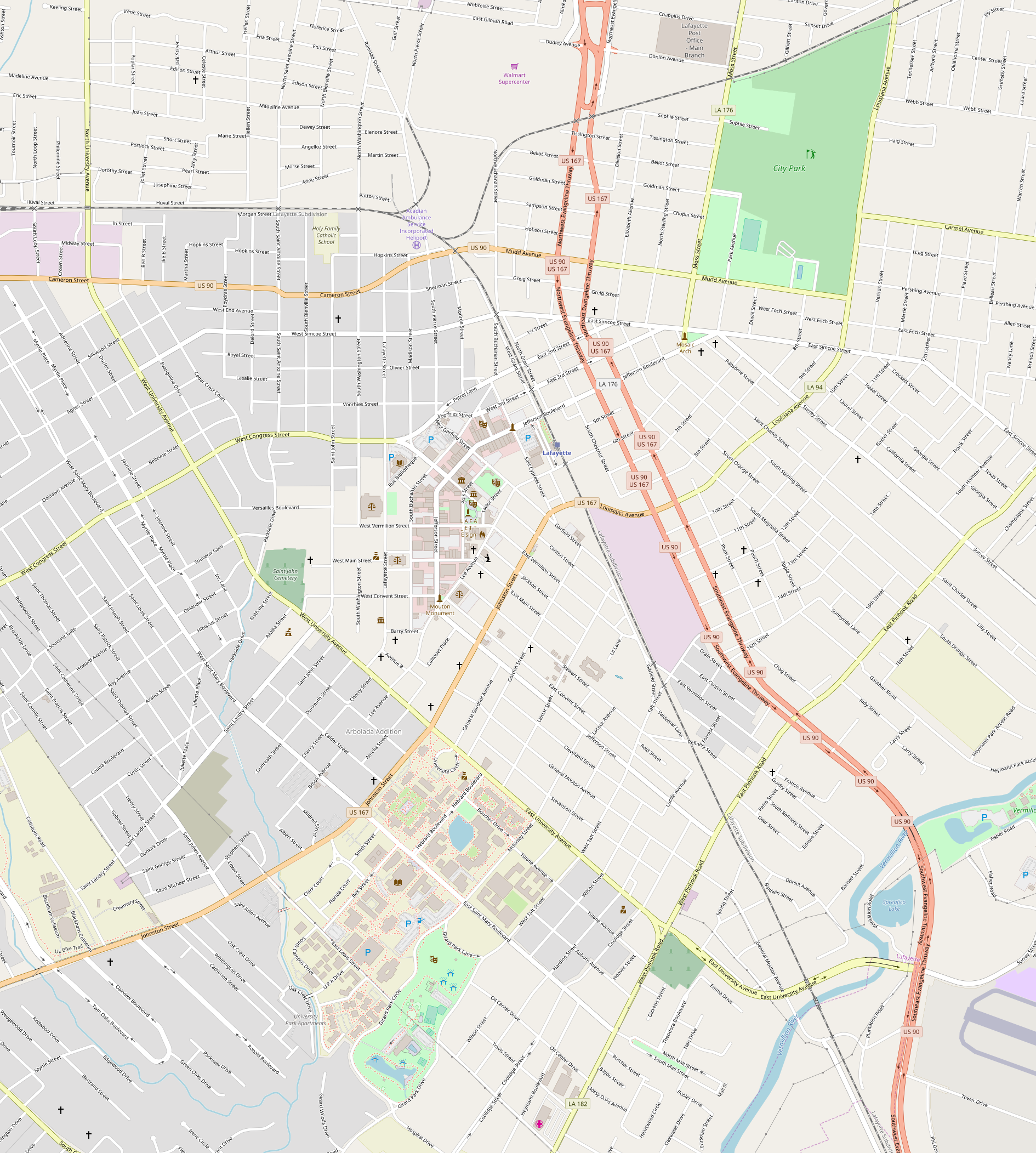
- Location within Lafayette
- Location: 614 Madison Street, Lafayette, Louisiana
- Coordinates: 30°13′39″N 92°01′12″W
- Area: less than one acre
- Built: c.1880
- Architectural style: Greek Revival
- NRHP reference No.: 02000654
- Added to NRHP: June 20, 2002

The Brandt House, also known as Bonnet House and Richard House, is a historic house located at 614 Madison Street in Lafayette, Louisiana.

Originally built in c.1840 as a two-room Creole cottage facing south with a gallery across the front, the house was hugely remodeled in c.1880, becoming a side hall cottage facing Madison Street. Alterations were so extensive that the building dates to the 1870s for the purpose of its architectural significance. The home is one of the few Greek Revival buildings which survives in downtown Lafayette.

The house is named after William Brandt, who bought it in 1859 from Charles H. Mouton and sold it to Alfred Bonnet in 1880. It is locally known also as the Richard House, after the family who purchased it in 1940s.

== See also ==
- National Register of Historic Places listings in Lafayette Parish, Louisiana
