= Old Guaranty Bank Building =

- U.S. National Register of Historic Places
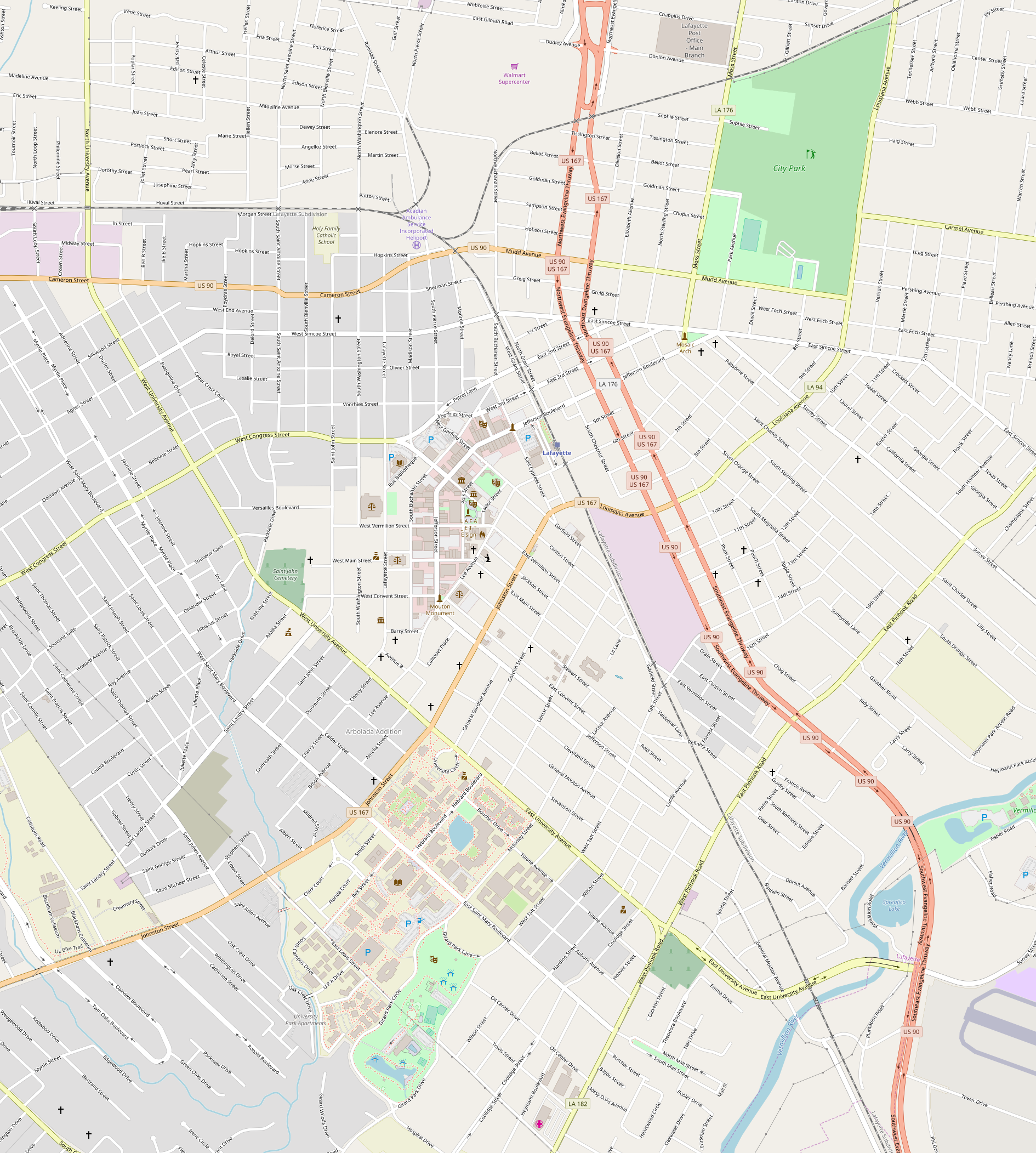
- Location within Lafayette
- Location: 500 Jefferson Street, Lafayette, Louisiana
- Coordinates: 30°13′32″N 92°01′07″W
- Area: 0.25 acres (0.10 ha)
- Built: 1905
- Built by: Bank of Lafayette
- Architectural style: Colonial Revival
- NRHP reference No.: 84001311
- Added to NRHP: July 12, 1984

The Old Guaranty Bank Building is a historic bank building located at 500 Jefferson Street in Lafayette, Louisiana.

Built in 1905, it is a two-story brick and terra cotta Colonial Revival commercial building.

The building was listed on the National Register of Historic Places on July 12, 1984.

== See also ==
- National Register of Historic Places listings in Lafayette Parish, Louisiana
