= Erin Blanchard =

American trampoline gymnast

- Full name: Erin Willis
- Born: November 20, 1989 (age 36)
- Height: 5 ft 6 in (168 cm)

Gymnastics career
- Discipline: Trampoline gymnastics
- Country represented: United States
- Club: Trampoline & Tumbling Express
- Head coaches: Tara Guidry & Dmitri Poliaroush

Erin Blanchard (born November 20, 1989, in Broussard, Louisiana) is a trampoline gymnast who represented the United States at the 2008 Summer Olympics in Beijing.

== Personal life ==
Blanchard is the daughter of Kay and Dwight Blanchard and has three brothers, Caleb, Jon and Dewey. In addition to gymnastics, she played softball and ran track and cross country throughout middle and high school. She graduated from Ovey Comeaux High School in 2008.

Blanchard is married to Lucas Willis, with whom she has two children, Audrey and Cameron. She lives in Midland, Texas, where she is an independent landman.

She is the cousin of former Louisiana State University softball player Katie Guillory.

== Trampoline career ==
After becoming the 2006 U.S. champion in women's trampoline, Blanchard stepped away from the sport in 2007. She told the Houston Chronicle: "I had some complications with the gym and the coach. I just had to get away from it all." During an eight-month break, she worked out with her brother, Caleb Blanchard, an IFBB professional body builder.

When the U.S. secured a wildcard Olympic spot, Blanchard applied to the Olympic Training Center Program in Colorado Springs, where her former coach was training Olympic prospects. She said that it took her about a month to relearn most of her skills. She went on to win three of four trials to secure the Olympic spot.

At the Olympics, Blanchard received scores of 27.1 for her compulsory routine and 33.8 for her optional routine. She was ranked 13th in the qualification round and did not advance to the finals, which were limited to the top 8.

== Results ==
=== National competitions ===
- 2001 Circle of Stars (1st, individual)
- 2001 USA Team Trials (1st, individual and synchronized)
- 2001 National Championships (3rd, individual; 2nd, synchronized)
- 2002 Winter Classics (1st, individual)
- 2002 National Championships (1st, individual and synchronized)
- 2006 Winter Classics (3rd, individual)
- 2006 Elite Challenge (1st, individual)
- 2006 National Championships (1st, individual and synchronized)
- 2007 Winter Classics (1st, individual)
- 2008 Winter Classics (1st, individual and synchronized)
- 2008 Elite Challenge (1st, individual and synchronized)
- 2008 National Championships (2nd, individual; 1st, synchronized)
- 2008 Olympic Trials (1st, individual)

=== International competitions ===
- 2000 Poliaroush Challenge, Canada (3rd, individual)
- 2000 Silnitskiy Cup, Belarus (4th, individual; 3rd, synchronized; 2nd, team)
- 2001 World Age Group Games, Denmark (1st, individual)
- 2002 Canada Cup, Canada (3rd, individual)
- 2002 Grenzland Cup, Germany (4th, individual)
- 2002 Greensboro Open, United States (1st, individual)
- 2005 Slavic Games, Belarus (2nd, individual)
- 2006 Pacific Alliance, Hawaii (1st, individual)
- 2006 World Cup, Belgium (13th, individual)
- 2006 Pan American Championships, Mexico (2nd, team)
- 2006 World Cup, Switzerland (5th, individual)
- 2006 World Cup, Germany (9th, individual)
- 2007 World Cup, United States (5th, individual)
- 2007 World Cup, Canada (9th, individual)
- 2008 Grenzland Cup, Germany (1st, individual)
- 2008 World Cup, Switzerland (10th, individual; 1st, synchronized)
- 2008 Olympic Games, China (13th, individual)
