= Alexandre Latiolais House =

Historic house in Louisiana, United States

- U.S. National Register of Historic Places
- Location within Louisiana Location within the United States
- Location: 900 East Butcher Switch Road, Lafayette, Louisiana
- Coordinates: 30°17′10″N 92°00′02″W
- Area: 4.3 acres (1.7 ha)
- Built: c.1790; c.1820
- Architectural style: Creole, Federal
- NRHP reference No.: 85000972
- Added to NRHP: May 9, 1985

The Alexandre Latiolais House is a historic house located at 900 East Butcher Switch Road in Lafayette, Louisiana, United States.

The 1 1/2-story building is the result of two periods of construction. The first one, dated c.1790, produced a complete house of four rooms, with a front and rear gallery and an attic, in a typical French Creole layout. About 1827, the building was enlarged in a more modern Federal style with the addition of two rooms to the northern side, the continuation of gallery and the updating of all the woodworks. It was originally owned by the Domingue family, and was sold to an investor that helped refurbish the home.

The building was listed on the National Register of Historic Places on May 9, 1985.

== See also ==
- National Register of Historic Places listings in Lafayette Parish, Louisiana
