= Daigle House =

Historic house in Louisiana, United States

- U.S. National Register of Historic Places
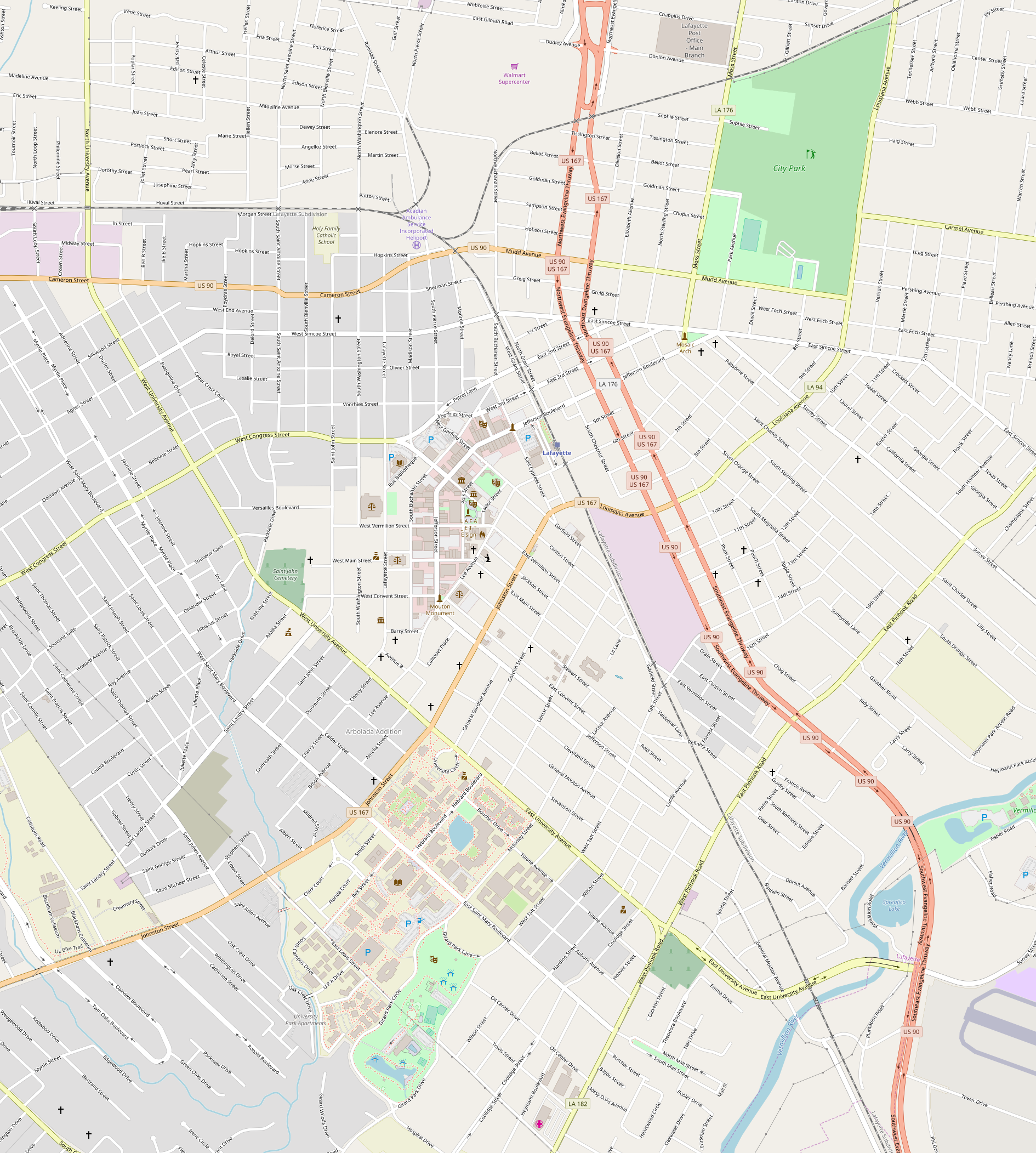
- Location within Lafayette
- Location: 1012 South Washington Street, Lafayette, Louisiana
- Coordinates: 30°13′20″N 92°01′20″W
- Area: 0.3 acres (0.12 ha)
- Built: c.1880
- Built by: Jules Revillon
- Architectural style: Greek Revival
- NRHP reference No.: 84001298
- Added to NRHP: June 14, 1984

Daigle House, also known as Revillon House or as La Maison Revillon, is a historic Creole cottage located at 1012 South Washington Street in Lafayette, Louisiana.

Built in Greek Revival style c.1880 by Jules Revillon, it is a five bay structure with a center entrance. It has a full front gallery featuring Doric posts with ogee molded capitals and a nearly full entablature. The front has two large dormers with pediments, pilasters and modest entablatures.

The house was purchased by Sidney and Norma Daigle in 1924. It was purchased by George and Pat Bradley in 2004, and, in 2017, is used as a real estate firm's office. (Note: The National Register listing gives the street address as 1022 South Washington St., which seems no longer to be correct. Downtown Lafayette gives 1021-B South Washington St. as its address in 2017. In 2018 the address seems to be 1012 South Washington St.)

The house was listed on the National Register of Historic Places on June 14, 1984.

== See also ==
- National Register of Historic Places listings in Lafayette Parish, Louisiana
