= Dupleix House =

Historic house in Louisiana, United States

- U.S. National Register of Historic Places
- Location within Louisiana Location within the United States
- Location: 106 Lafayette Street, Youngsville, Louisiana
- Coordinates: 30°05′56″N 91°59′24″W
- Area: 2.93 acres (1.19 ha)
- Built: c.1910
- Built by: Pierre Alcide Dupleix
- Architectural style: Queen Anne, Colonial Revival
- NRHP reference No.: 84000013
- Added to NRHP: October 4, 1984

Dupleix House is a historic house located at 106 Lafayette Street in Youngsville, Louisiana, United States.

Built c.1895 as a single story cottage and enlarged c.1910 by Pierre Alcide Dupleix, the house is a large two-story frame residence with Queen Anne and Colonial Revival elements. To the rear of the house there are two sheds which are considered contributing elements.

The house was listed on the National Register of Historic Places on October 4, 1984.

== See also ==
- National Register of Historic Places listings in Lafayette Parish, Louisiana
