= Bank of Scott =

- U.S. National Register of Historic Places
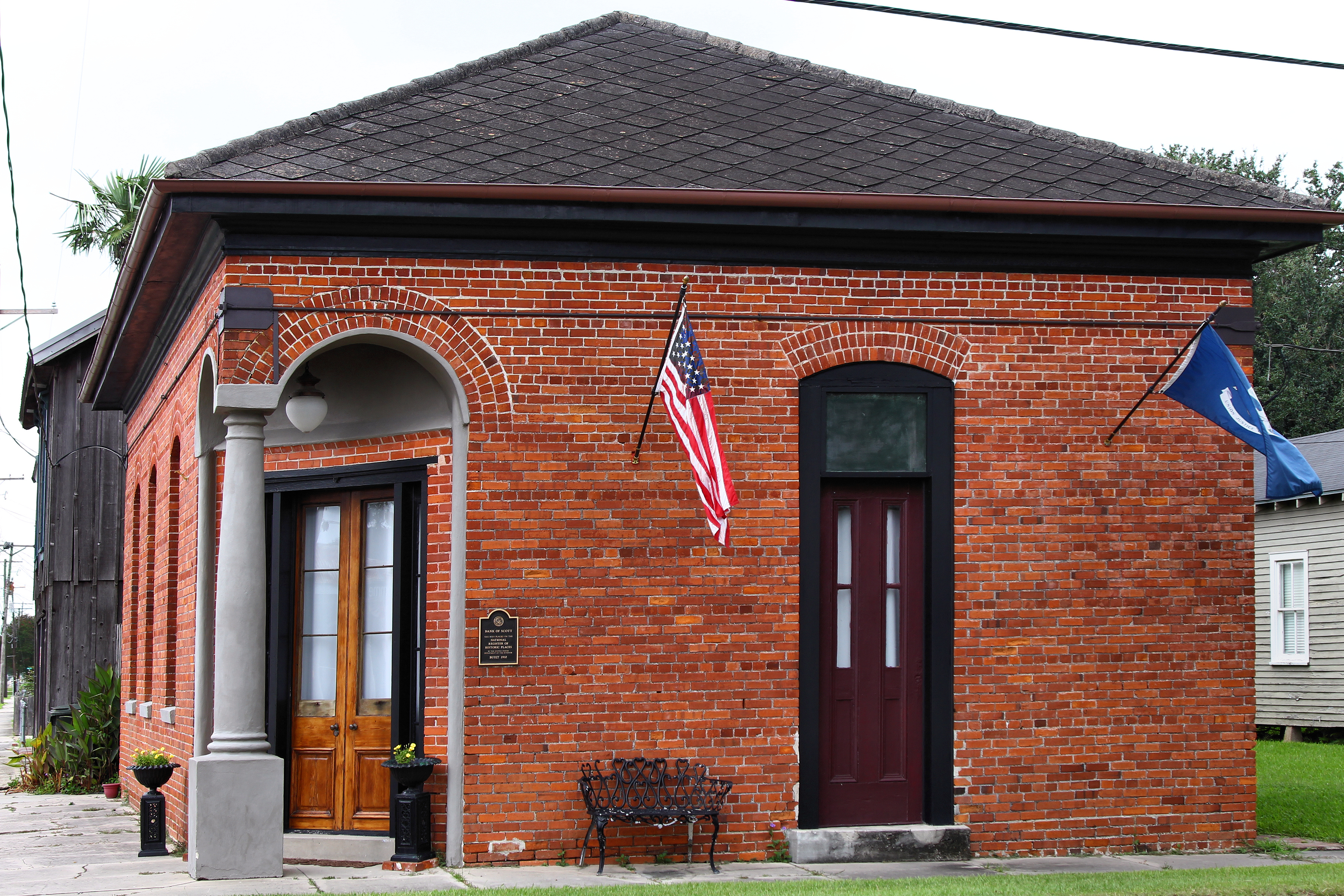

- Location within Louisiana Location within the United States
- Location: 1102 Saint Mary Street, Scott, Louisiana
- Coordinates: 30°14′09″N 92°05′41″W
- Area: less than an acre
- Built: 1910
- Architectural style: Commercial
- NRHP reference No.: 16000671
- Added to NRHP: September 19, 2016

The Bank of Scott is a historic bank building located at 1102 Saint Mary Street in Scott, Louisiana.

The one-story red brick structure was built in 1910. It's an example of Commercial architecture from the early 20th century. The building was used as a bank until the Great Depression of 1932. In 1938 the building was photographed by New Deal photographer Russell Lee to document how the Depression had impacted little communities. It was then used as a meeting room for the major and city council until 1957, when the first city hall was built. From 1957 to 1976 the building was used for various functions and as storage. In 1976 the building was sold to Paul Begnaud, which transformed the building to his residence and still opened his home to visitors until his death in 2015.

The building was listed on the National Register of Historic Places on September 19, 2016.

== See also ==
- National Register of Historic Places listings in Lafayette Parish, Louisiana
