= Lafayette Hardware Store =

- U.S. National Register of Historic Places
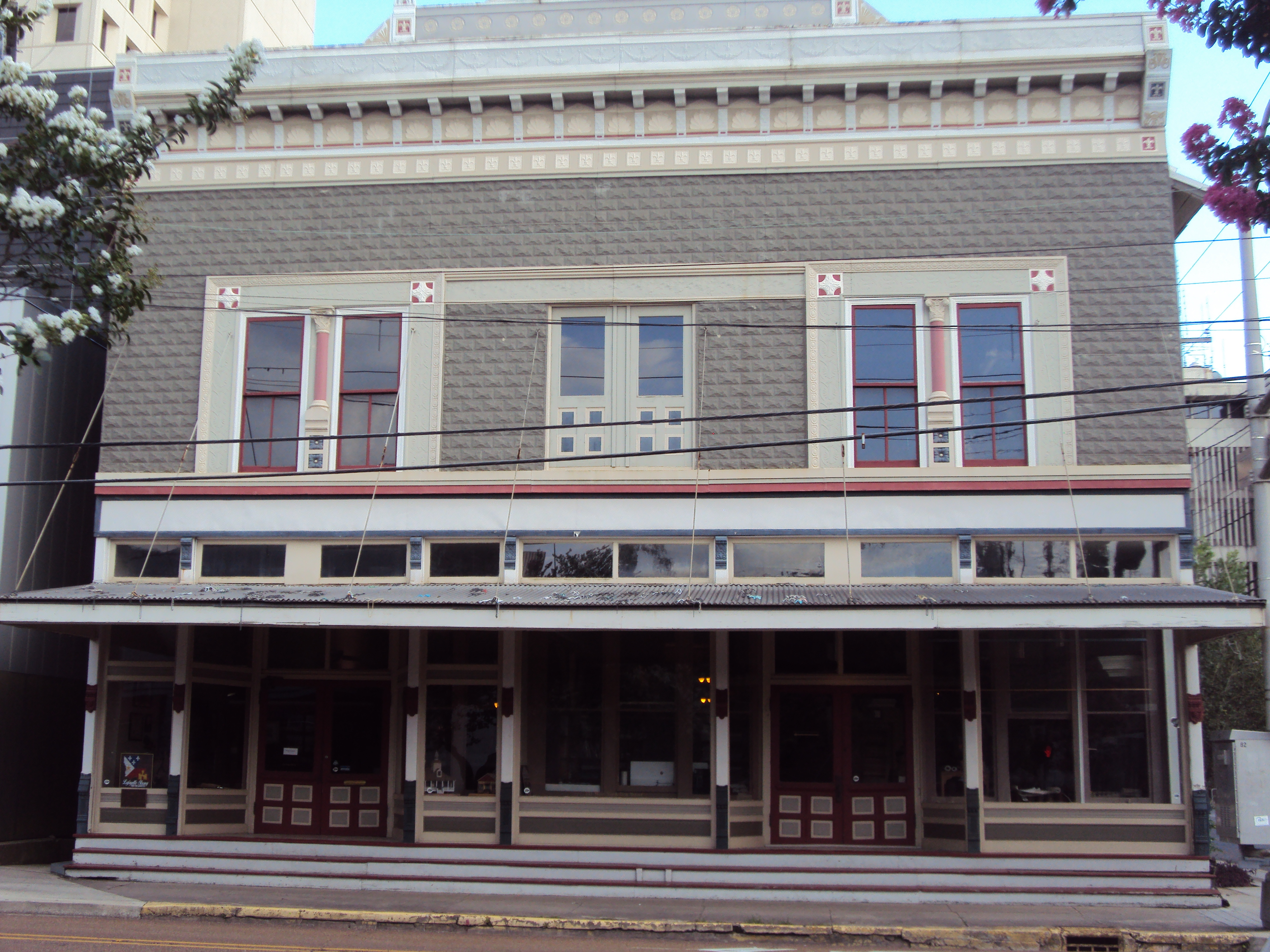

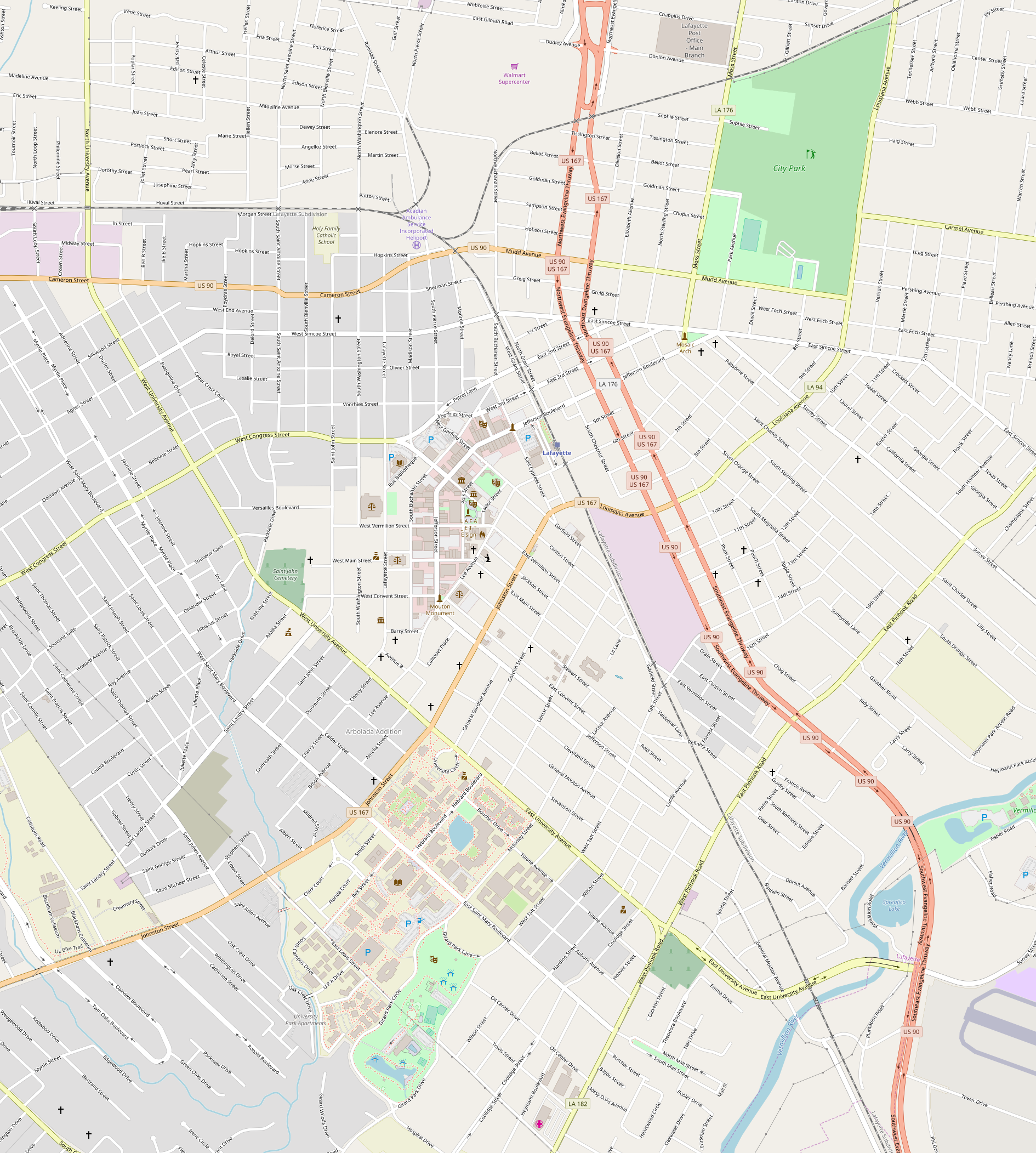
- Location within Lafayette
- Location: 121 West Vermilion Street, Lafayette, Louisiana
- Coordinates: 30°13′26″N 92°01′11″W
- Area: 0.33 acres (0.13 ha)
- Built: c.1890
- Built by: Mr. and Mrs. George Hopkins
- Architectural style: Italianate
- NRHP reference No.: 84001309
- Added to NRHP: June 14, 1984

The Lafayette Hardware Store is a historic commercial building located at 121 West Vermilion Street in Lafayette, Louisiana, United States.

Built in c.1890, is a two-story frame building with a false front in Italianate style. The ground story originally hosted two separate stores until c.1915 when a dividing wall was removed. The store is one of Lafayette oldest commercial buildings.

The building was listed on the National Register of Historic Places on June 14, 1984.

== See also ==
- National Register of Historic Places listings in Lafayette Parish, Louisiana
