= First United Methodist Church (Lafayette, Louisiana) =

Historic church in Louisiana, United States

- U.S. National Register of Historic Places
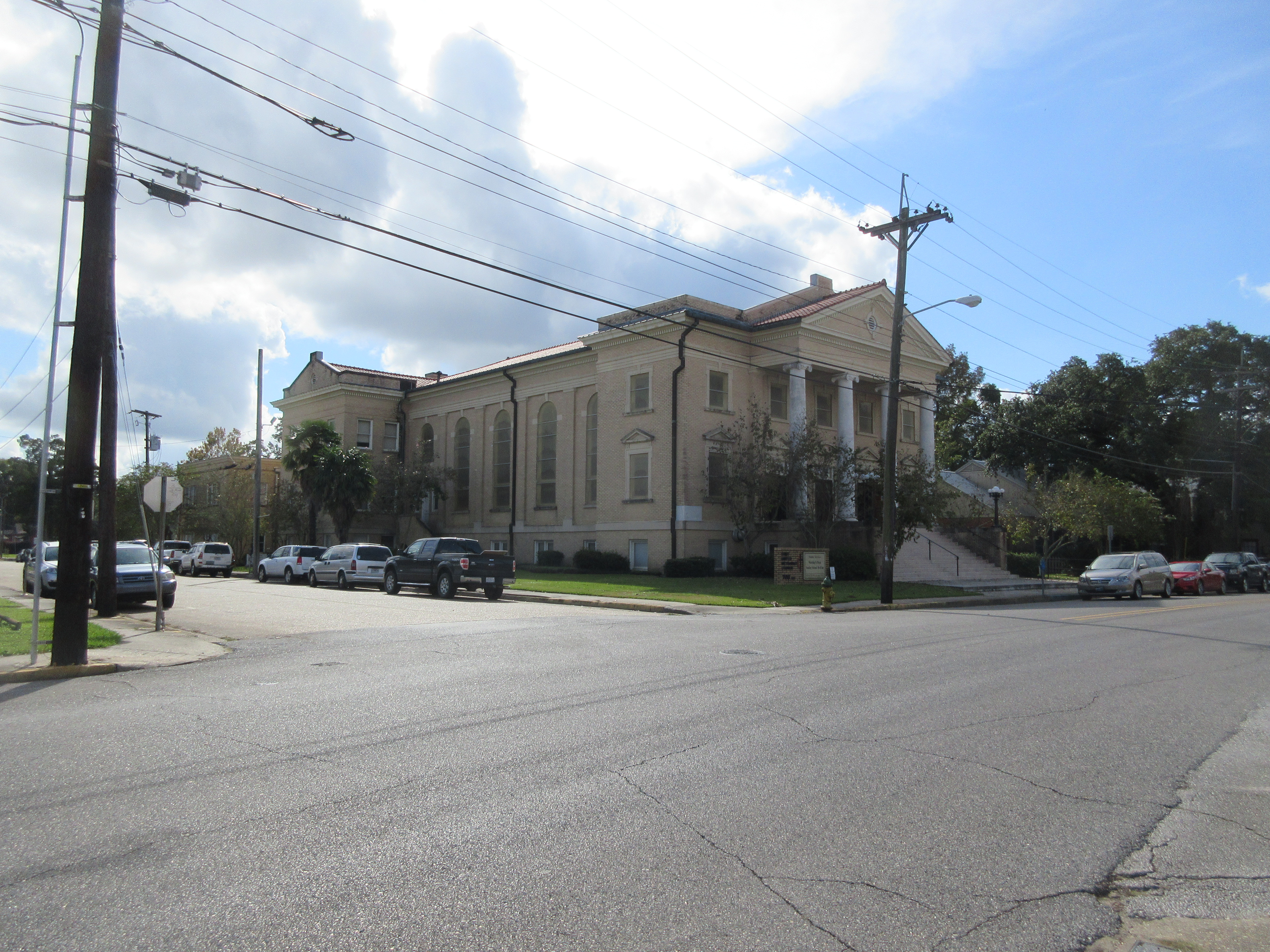

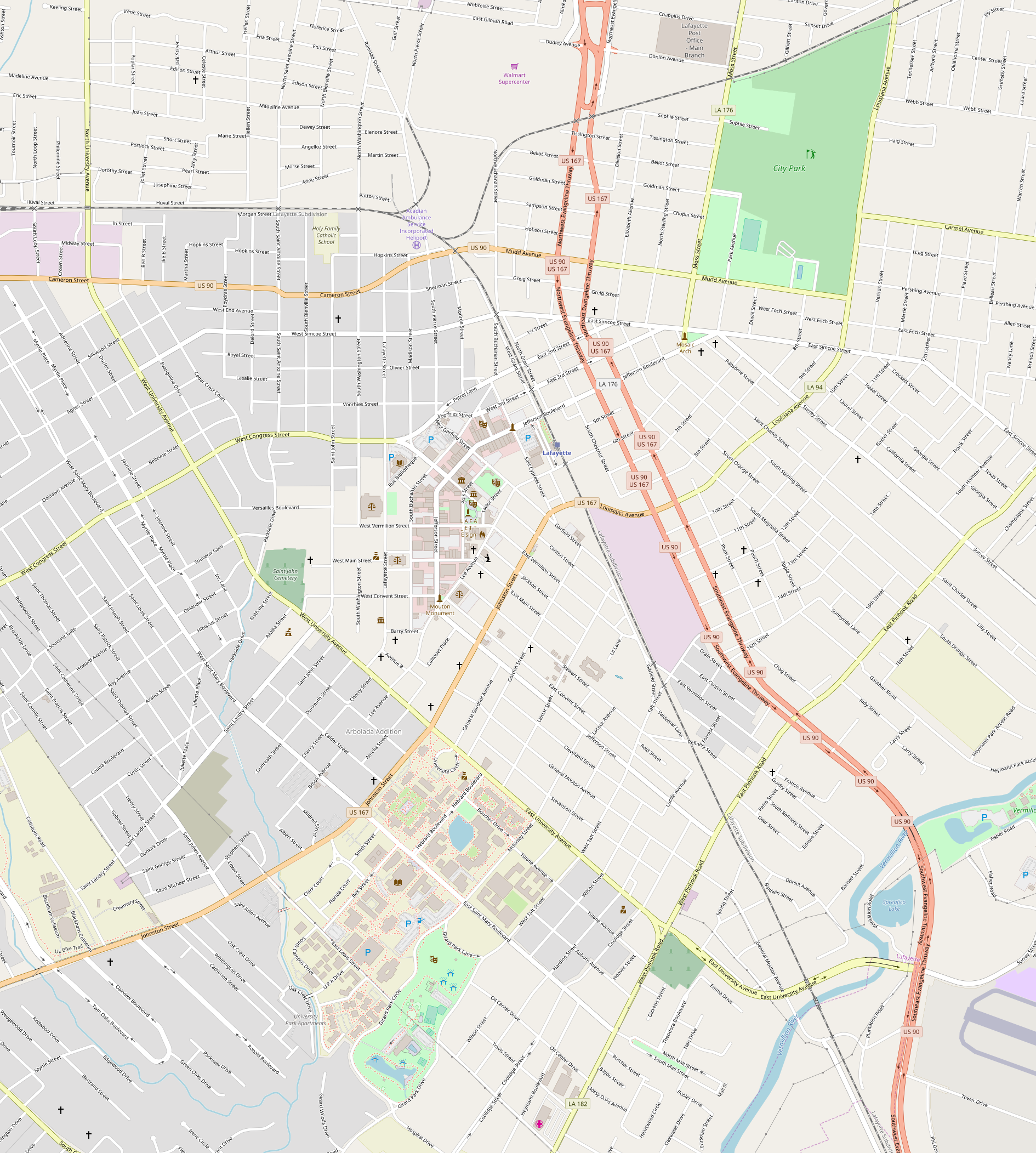
- Location within Lafayette
- Location: 703 Lee Avenue, Lafayette, Louisiana
- Coordinates: 30°13′21″N 92°01′02″W
- Area: 0.75 acres (0.30 ha)
- Built: 1924
- Built by: Knapp and East
- Architect: J.A. Baylor
- Architectural style: Classical Revival
- NRHP reference No.: 84001307
- Added to NRHP: June 21, 1984

The First United Methodist Church is a historic Methodist church located at 703 Lee Avenue in Lafayette, Louisiana.

Built in 1924, it is a three-story building in Classical Revival style, with a five-bay front facade and a pedimented portico with four Ionic columns. It was designed by architect J.A. Baylor and built by contractor Knapp & East. According to its NRHP nomination it is one of only three buildings in Lafayette Parish known to have a monumental portico; of those it is "the only one with ornamental fenestration surrounds. It is therefore one of the parish's most pretentious and most high style period buildings."

The church was added to the National Register of Historic Places on June 21, 1984.

== See also ==
- National Register of Historic Places listings in Lafayette Parish, Louisiana
