= Elrose (Lafayette, Louisiana) =

Historic house in Louisiana, United States

- U.S. National Register of Historic Places
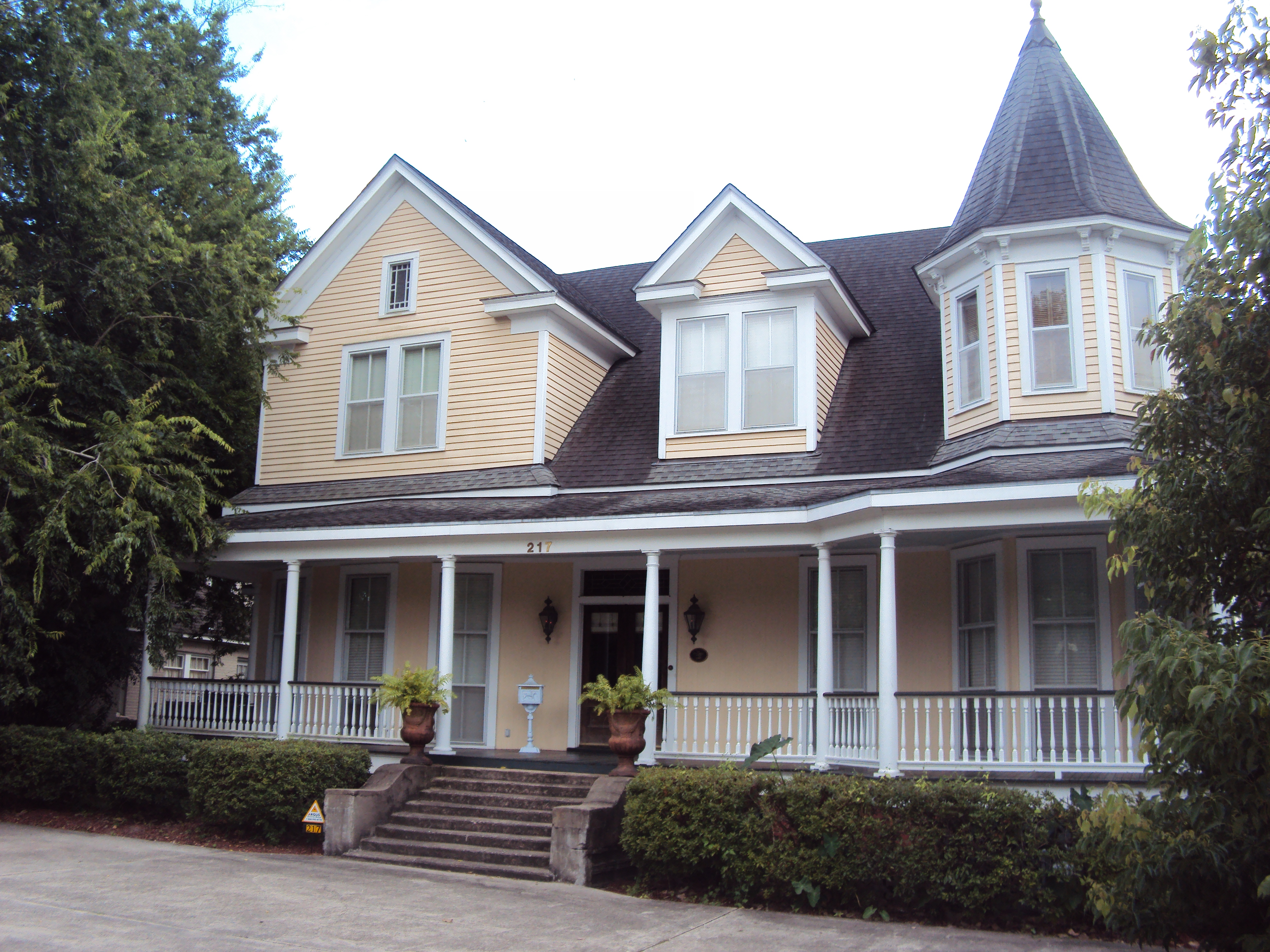

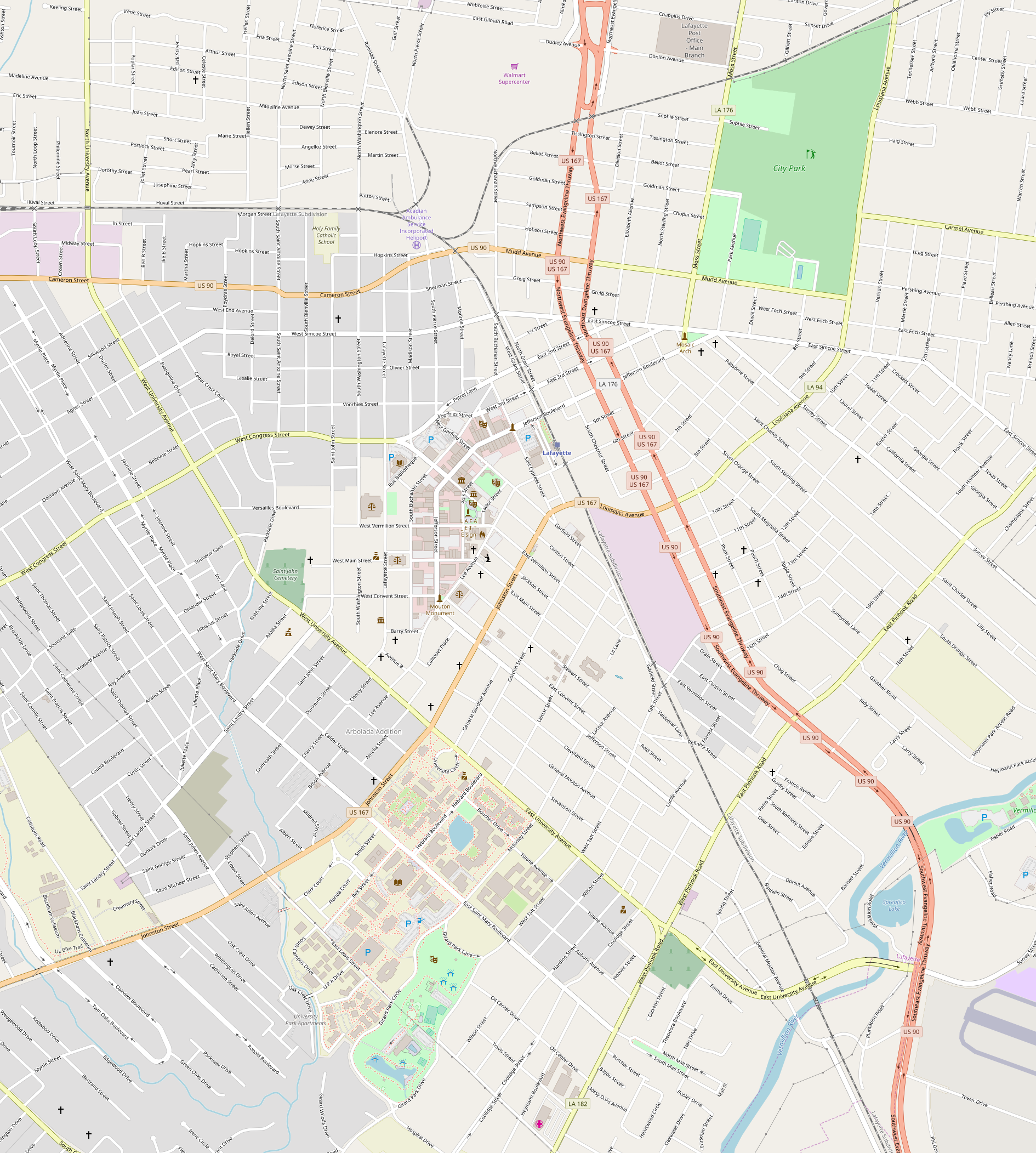
- Location within Lafayette
- Location: 217 West University Avenue, Lafayette, Louisiana
- Coordinates: 30°13′05″N 92°01′15″W
- Area: 0.5 acres (0.20 ha)
- Built: 1900
- Built by: Crow Girard
- Architectural style: Queen Anne, Colonial Revival
- NRHP reference No.: 84001305
- Added to NRHP: June 14, 1984

Elrose is a historic house located at 217 West University Avenue in Lafayette, Louisiana, United States.

Built in 1900 by Crow Girard, the house is a large 1 1/2-story frame residence in Queen Anne style with Colonial Revival elements. The distinctive roofline comprises an octagonal corner turret, a central dormer, and a very large side dormer.

The house was listed on the National Register of Historic Places on June 14, 1984.

== See also ==
- National Register of Historic Places listings in Lafayette Parish, Louisiana
