= Broussard, Louisiana =

- City
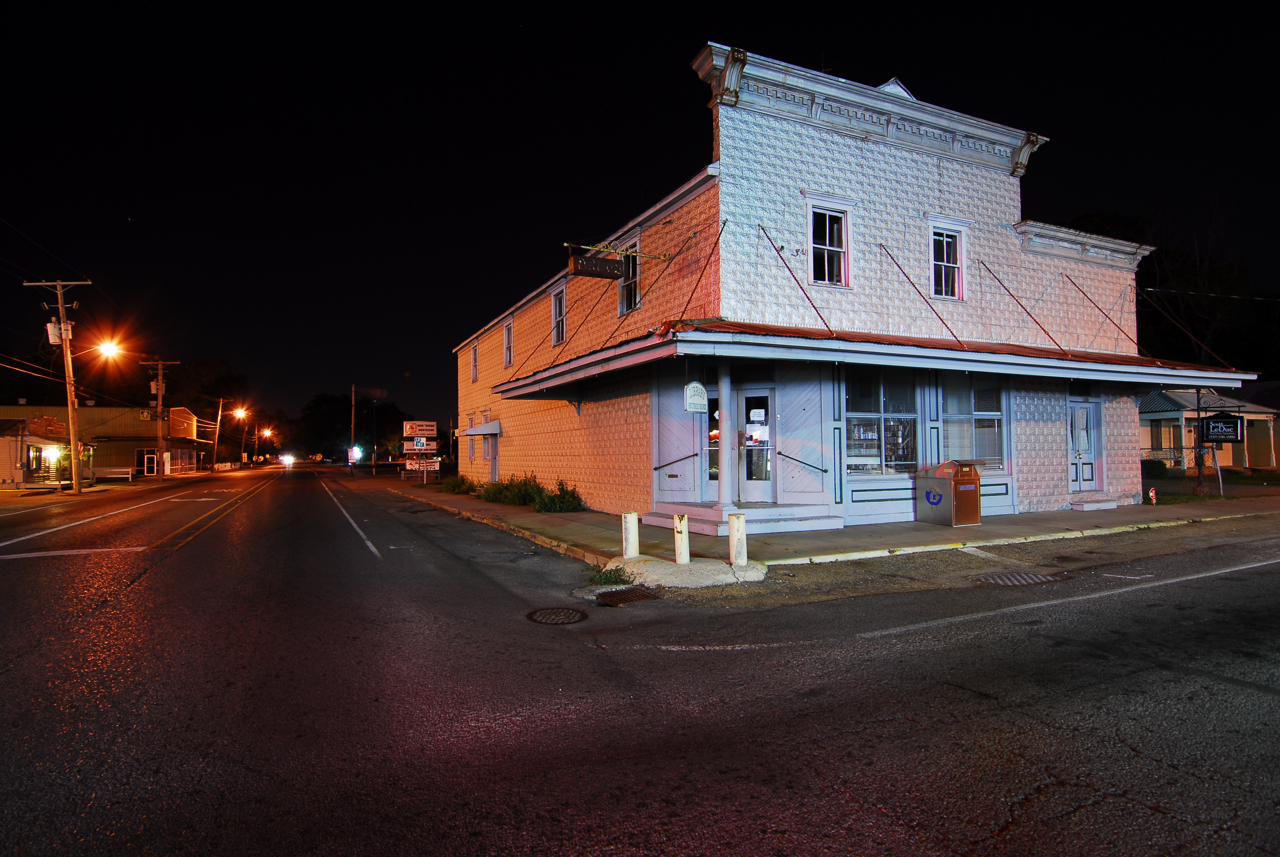
- Downtown
- Motto: "Where Our Rich Culture Defines Us!"
- Location of Broussard in Lafayette and St. Martin Parish, Louisiana.

- Location of Louisiana in the United States
- Coordinates: 30°08′32″N 91°57′49″W
- Country: United States
- State: Louisiana
- Parish: Lafayette, St. Martin
- Incorporated: 1884

Government
  - Mayor: Ray Bourque (R)

Area
  - Total: 18.03 sq mi (46.70 km^{2})
  - Land: 17.99 sq mi (46.60 km^{2})
  - Water: 0.039 sq mi (0.10 km^{2})
- Elevation: 33 ft (10 m)

Population (2020)
  - Total: 13,417
  - Density: 745.8/sq mi (287.94/km^{2})
- Time zone: UTC-6 (CST)
  - Summer (DST): UTC-5 (CDT)
- ZIP Code: 70518
- Area code: 337
- FIPS code: 22-10075
- Website: Broussard, Louisiana

Broussard is a city in Lafayette and St. Martin parishes in the U.S. state of Louisiana. The population was 8,197 at the 2010 U.S. census, and 13,417 at the 2020 United States census. Broussard is part of the Lafayette metropolitan statistical area.

== History ==
The community was originally named Côte Gelée (Frozen Hill) because of its hilly ridge area and the severe winter of 1784. Broussard was founded in 1884. It was named after Valsin Broussard, a prominent local merchant, who formed the first vigilante committee when his own store was robbed. He was a direct descendant of Joseph Broussard de Beausoleil, one of the first 200 Acadians to arrive in Louisiana on February 27, 1765, aboard the Santo Domingo.

Primary agricultural resources include sugarcane, soybean and hay production as well as horse and cattle farming. Principal industries consist of oil and gas service companies, food distributors, real estate developments and manufacturing.

Broussard has gone from a horse and buggy community, with large sugarcane plantation homes, to a current day industrial community with over 300 businesses. It was designated a city in November 2002.

== Geography ==
Broussard is located at 30°8′32″N 91°57′49″W (30.142329, -91.963644), in the southern Louisiana region of Acadiana. Most of the city limits are located in Lafayette Parish with a small eastern portion of the city being located in St. Martin Parish.

The city of St. Martinville, the parish seat of St. Martin Parish is located about 10 miles (16 km) east of Broussard in which Louisiana Highway 96 passes through both communities. Louisiana Highway 182 and U.S. Route 90 (future Interstate 49) also pass through the city with Lafayette, the parish seat of Lafayette Parish, being located northwest (7 miles (11 km)) and New Iberia, the parish seat of Iberia Parish, located southeast (14 miles (23 km)).

According to the United States Census Bureau, the town has a total area of 11.4 square miles (29.6 km^{2}), of which 11.4 square miles (29.5 km^{2}) is land and 0.04 square mile (0.1 km^{2}) (0.18%) is water.

== Demographics ==
Historical population
Census	Pop.	Note	%±
1900	290		—
1910	499		72.1%
1920	602		20.6%
1930	806		33.9%
1940	791		−1.9%
1950	1,237		56.4%
1960	1,600		29.3%
1970	1,707		6.7%
1980	2,923		71.2%
1990	3,213		9.9%
2000	5,874		82.8%
2010	8,197		39.5%
2020	13,417		63.7%
2025 (est.)	15,799	▲	17.8%
U.S. Decennial Census

Broussard racial composition as of 2020
Race	Number	Percentage
White (non-Hispanic)	9,770	72.82%
Black or African American (non-Hispanic)	2,129	15.87%
Native American	56	0.42%
Asian	264	1.97%
Pacific Islander	4	0.03%
Other/Mixed	500	3.73%
Hispanic or Latino	694	5.17%

As of the 2020 United States census, there were 13,417 people, 4,370 households, and 2,881 families residing in the city. The 2019 American Community Survey determined the racial and ethnic makeup of the city was 78.4% non-Hispanic white, 14.7% Black and African American, 0.3% American Indian and Alaska Native, 1.3% Asian, 0.8% two or more races, and 4.7% Hispanic and Latin American of any race.

Of the population in 2019, there were 4,370 households living in 5,018 housing units. An average of 2.69 people lived in a household. In 2019, the median age of the city was 35.1, and there was a median household income of $82,677. Males had a median income of $62,012 versus $50,930 for females, and 13.3% of the population lived at or below the poverty line.

== Sports ==
The Chitimacha Louisiana Open is a golf tournament of the Web.com Tour played at Le Triomphe Golf & Country Club since 1992.

== Notable people ==
- Erin Blanchard, gymnast
- Illinois Jacquet, jazz musician
