= Current =

Currents, Current or The Current may refer to:

== Science ==
- Current (fluid), the flow of a liquid or a gas
  - Air current, a flow of air
  - Ocean current, a current in the ocean
    - Rip current, a kind of water current
  - Current (hydrology), currents in rivers and streams
  - Convection current, flow caused by unstable density variation due to temperature differences
- Current (mathematics), geometrical current in differential topology
- Conserved current, a field associated to a symmetry in field theory
- Electric current, a flow of electric charge through a medium
- Thermal current, a flow of heat through a medium
- IBM Current, an early personal information management program
- Google Currents
  - Google Currents (news app), an app developed by Google that provided electronic access to full-length magazine articles between 2011 and 2013
  - Google Currents (social app), an app developed by Google for internal enterprise communication between 2019 and 2023
- Probability current, in quantum mechanics

== Arts and entertainment ==
=== Music ===
- Currents (band), an American metal band
- Current (album), a 1982 album by Heatwave
- Currents (album), a 2015 album by Tame Impala
- Currents (Eisley album), 2013
- Currents (In Vain album), 2018
- "The Current" (song), by the Blue Man Group
- "Currents", a song by Dashboard Confessional from Dusk and Summer, 2006
- "Currents", a song by Drake from Honestly, Nevermind, 2022
- "The Currents", a song by Bastille from Wild World, 2016

=== Film, television and radio ===
- Current (1992 film), a Bollywood film
- Current (2009 film), a Telugu film
- Current TV, a defunct television channel in the US
- Currents (TV series), an American Catholic news magazine television show
- The Current (radio program), CBC Radio, Canada
- KCMP or 89.3 The Current, a Minnesota Public Radio station, US
- KDAM or Current 94.3, a radio station serving Yankton and Vermillion, South Dakota

=== Publications ===
- Current (newspaper), an American trade journal
- Currents (periodical), an international trade law journal
- Current Publishing, an American publishing company
- Current Publishing (UK), a British publishing company
- The Current (news organization), a non-profit online news organization in Lafayette, Louisiana
- The Current (magazine), a student journal of Columbia University, US
- The Current (newspaper), the student newspaper of the University of Missouri-St. Louis, US
- The Current (NSU), the student newspaper of the Nova Southeastern University, US
- The Current Newspapers, four print and online weekly community newspapers in Washington, DC, US

== People ==
- William Current (1933–2024), American politician

== Other uses ==
- Current Lighting Solutions, an electric subsidiary of American Industrial Partners formerly owned by General Electric
- Current (financial services company), a US financial services company also known as Finco Services, Inc.
- Kansas City Current, American soccer team in the National Women's Soccer League
- The Current, branding for bus routes operated by Southeast Vermont Transit
- USS Current, a ship
- Current (sculpture), a soft fiber sculpture by Janet Echelman

== See also ==
- Current affairs (disambiguation)
- Current events
- Conserved current, a concept in physics and mathematics that satisfies the continuity equation
- Current density, a mathematical concept unifying electric current, fluid current, and others
- Current River (Ozarks), Missouri, US
- Currant (disambiguation)
- Kurrent, German handwriting style
