= Statue of Alfred Mouton =

Statue formerly installed in Lafayette, Louisiana, U.S.

- Artist: Unknown
- Year: 1922
- Medium: Marble
- Subject: Alfred Mouton (1829–1864)
- Location: Kentwood, Louisiana, United States (2021-present) Lafayette, Louisiana, United States (1922-2021)

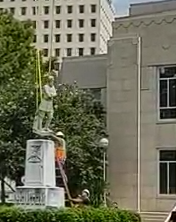
Removal of the statue in Lafayette, Louisiana.

In 1922, the United Daughters of the Confederacy donated a statue of Alfred Mouton, a Confederate general in the American Civil War, to the City of Lafayette, Louisiana, United States. The donation was without condition, and the statue was erected on city property in front of the City Hall. The sculptor's identity is unknown.

The Lafayette community organization Move the Mindset was founded in 2016 by Fred Prejean and others. A major goal of the organization was to gain local support for relocating the Alfred Mouton statue from the former City Hall site in downtown Lafayette to an educational site, museum, or Civil War battlefield. That goal was achieved on July 21, 2020, when the city/parish council and mayor/president Josh Guillory gave their unanimous support for moving the statue.

The United Daughters of the Confederacy initially opposed the move, but on July 16, 2021, they signed a settlement agreeing that the city would bear the cost for moving the statue to another location. It was removed the next day. The statue was moved to Camp Moore, a former Confederate military camp and now historic site in Kentwood, Louisiana.

== See also ==
- List of monuments and memorials removed during the George Floyd protests
- Removal of Confederate monuments and memorials
