= Fred Prejean =

American community leader (1946–2022)

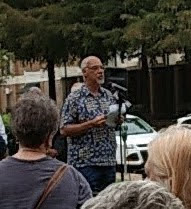
- Fred Prejean speaking at the site of the Mouton statue in Lafayette, Louisiana, August 28, 2018
- Born: September 6, 1946; Lafayette, Louisiana, U.S.
- Died: January 27, 2022 (aged 75); Lafayette, Louisiana, U.S.
- Education: Holy Rosary Institute; Southern University
- Spouse: Ola Sims Prejean
- Children: Daughter Masharika Prejean Maddison (Sean)
- Parent(s): Oran and Edolia Prejean

Fredrick James Prejean Sr. (September 6, 1946 - January 27, 2022) was an American activist from Lafayette, Louisiana.

== Biography ==
=== Early life and education ===
Fred Prejean was born in 1946 in Lafayette, Louisiana to Oran and Edolia Prejean. He grew up near downtown Lafayette in an area colloquially known as Fightinville (or Fightingville).

In August 1963, just one week before his seventeenth birthday, Prejean found his life purpose. As a student at Holy Rosary Institute, he received permission from his family to attend the March on Washington for Jobs and Freedom. There, he witnessed Dr. Martin Luther King Jr.'s iconic "I Have a Dream" speech and saw civil rights legends John Lewis and Rosa Parks. He returned to Lafayette with a newfound understanding of what community meant, and how he hoped to influence his beloved hometown. "That experience became my north star," Prejean said in 2020. Prejean went on to be a community activist for over 50 years.

Upon high school graduation in 1964 from Holy Rosary Institute, Prejean served in the United States Marine Corps Reserve for six years. Prejean credited his military experience with teaching him the importance of teamwork, strategy, discipline, and communication.

Immediately after high school graduation, Prejean began building his career working as a recruiter, trainer, and supervisor of community organizers in the burgeoning consumer cooperative movement.

Prejean worked with an organization headed by Fr A.J. McKnight, the Southern Consumers Cooperative. There he helped black entrepreneurs envision, design, and launch startup businesses, and received his early training as a community organizer. In Sunset, Louisiana, Prejean helped to organize a buyers club to enable members to buy their groceries at a cheaper price. He also worked in Sunset to help local farmers establish the Grand Marie Vegetable Producers Cooperative to give Black farmers power over their prices for sweet potatoes. At the time, Black farmers were not paid the same price for their produce as white farmers. The cooperative allowed Black farmers to skip the white middleman and sell directly to northern markets. This cooperative development movement of activists ultimately evolved into the Federation of Southern Cooperatives which succeeded in establishing more than 150 small businesses across 11 southern states.

In 1970, Prejean enrolled in Southern University studying Accounting and Business Management. In March 1972, Fred Prejean and other students traveled by bus to Gary, Indiana to participate in the National Black Political Convention. Prejean described this experience as "another march on Washington kind of experience for me."

Fred Prejean was a member and leader of a Southern University student group called Students United. In the fall semester of 1972, students led a campus protest and class boycott over concerns about equitable funding for the university, and a proposal to administratively merge Southern University and Louisiana State University to provide an appearance of integration. A court injunction was issued ordering five student leaders of the protest movement including Prejean to not come on campus. However, all of the leaders continued to go on campus. After about a week, law enforcement entered Prejean's home at three o'clock in the morning on November 16, 1972, and arrested him.

Having learned of the early-morning arrest of Prejean and three other student leaders, a group of students went to the school administration building to ask the school president for help getting their classmates released. The campus protests were peaceful, but an anonymous caller allegedly then incorrectly reported to local law enforcement that the university president had been taken hostage. Law enforcement responded in force, some sent by Governor Edwin Edwards. Before Prejean was released on bail, two students, Denver Smith and Leonard Brown, were killed by law enforcement officers during a peaceful campus protest. These murders were never solved. Denver Smith and Leonard Brown both appear as cases that were opened under the Emmett Till Antilynching Act. According to a 2024 list of cases under the Till Act, the case remains open.

Following the shootings, nine student protest leaders including Prejean were expelled from the university and banned from campus. Prejean chose to fight for his right to graduate. He took classes at Xavier University of Louisiana in New Orleans. In December 1974, a state judge lifted Prejean's ban from campus, allowing him to graduate from Southern.

=== Community service ===
After graduating from Southern University, Prejean again worked for the Federation of Southern Cooperatives. Three credit unions that provided low interest loans to members were established with Prejean's guidance – St. Paul's Federal Credit Union in Lafayette, Louisiana; St. Jules Federal Credit Union in Franklin, Louisiana; and Madison Parish Federal Credit Union in Tallulah, Louisiana.

From 1999 to 2007, Fred Prejean was a member and Chairperson of the Lafayette Planning and Zoning Commission. The McComb-Veazey and Freetown-Port Rico neighborhood organizations formed during his tenure with planning and zoning.

Prejean served as undersecretary at the Louisiana Department of Wildlife and Fisheries from 1991 to 1996. He was also president of a consulting firm, Empire Management Inc., and retired from that position in 2012

Fred Prejean founded a community organization, Move the Mindset, in 2016, and served as its president from 2016 until his death in 2022. Move the Mindset is not only a membership organization but also a coalition of local organizations. Move the Mindset is committed to promoting racial and social justice through education, dialog, the arts, and direct action. The organization seeks to educate and establish community acknowledgement concerning the local history of slavery and racial terrorism while seeking forgiveness and reconciliation. An important goal was to gain support for relocating the statue of Confederate General Alfred Mouton from in front of the old City Hall in downtown Lafayette to an educational site, museum, or Civil War battlefield. With the unanimous support of the city/parish council and mayor/president Josh Guillory, that goal was achieved on July 17, 2021 when the statue was removed and finally moved to Camp Moore, a historic confederate camp and cemetery.

Prejean actively served his Lafayette community in many other roles. From 1986 to 1988, Prejean was a volunteer Business Advisor and Board Member for St. Paul's Catholic School. In 2006, Prejean was member and president of the Lafayette Neighborhood Economic Development Corporation. He joined the Lafayette North Planning Coordinating Team for a year in 2007. He also served as a member of the Greater Southwest Louisiana Black Chamber of Commerce, was a board member for Festival International de Louisiane and a member of the Lafayette Chapter of the NAACP. He also served as the committee chairperson for the Heymann Scholarship Academic Awards. Prejean worked with other members of a restoration committee to develop a business plan to help restore the Holy Rosary Institute. The Institute was a historic Black Catholic high school founded in 1913 and closed in 1993.

=== Death ===
Prejean died on January 27, 2022 in Lafayette at the age of seventy-five. A community memorial service was held on February 4, 2022 at the Acadiana Center for the Arts.

== Personal life ==
During his first days on campus at Southern, while walking to the student union, he met Ola Sims, who would later become his wife and partner in community leadership. Sims and Prejean married in August 1974.

Prejean was a Catholic.

== Legacy and honors ==
Over the years, Prejean received numerous honors and awards in recognition of his community service.

- 2020 Lafayette Civic Cup - An award given to honor an outstanding individual who has given of their time and resources to improve the Lafayette community.
