= The Current (news organization) =

Non-profit online news organization in Lafayette, Louisiana

- Type: Non-profit online news organization
- Editor: Christiaan Mader
- Managing editor: Leslie Turk
- Founded: 2017; 9 years ago
- Language: English
- City: Lafayette, Louisiana, United States
- Website: thecurrentla.com

The Current is a non-profit news organization in Lafayette, Louisiana. It describes itself as an "independent, digital newsroom pursuing answers to Lafayette's big questions."

== History ==
The Current first appeared in April 2017 as a glossy print monthly published by IND Media, the company behind The IND Monthly (previously The Independent Weekly), a Lafayette alternative newspaper. With a print run of 10,000 copies, it was branded as "Lafayette's journal of culture, commentary and ideas."

The glossy Current only lasted three issues. In July 2017, amid widespread financial declines in newspapers, IND Media announced it was shutting down The IND Monthly after 14 years and suspending publication of The Current. A few weeks later, IND Media announced that The Current's editorial director, Christiaan Mader, was acquiring the brand and planned to relaunch it as "a community-supported, primarily digital outlet," which it did in April 2018.

The following year, The Current announced it would become a nonprofit organization, putting "local journalism where it always belonged — in the category of public service." It was granted 501(c)(3) status by the Internal Revenue Service in February 2021.

== Organization and funding ==
Mader is The Current's editor. Leslie Turk, previously of The IND Monthly, is managing editor.

The Current is a member of the Institute for Nonprofit News, Solutions Journalism Network, and LION Publishers. David Begnaud of CBS News is a member of its board of directors.

It is primarily funded by Lafayette-area individuals and foundations, but it has also received donations from the Google News Initiative, the Facebook Journalism Project, the Solutions Journalism Network, the Local Media Foundation, and the Fund for Nonprofit News at The Miami Foundation.

In 2020, it reported annual revenue of $90,930. That sum increased to $256,717 in 2021 and $289,786 in 2022.
