= Currant =

Currant may refer to:

== Plants ==
- Ribes, genus of berry plants, e.g., blackcurrant, redcurrant and whitecurrant
- Zante currant (US), dried black Corinth grapes; smaller than raisins (just "currant" in other English-speaking countries)
- Currant tomato, Solanum pimpinellifolium, small tomato species
- Currant-tree, Amelanchier canadensis, also called Juneberry or shadblow serviceberry
- Currant bush, Carissa spinarum also called conkerberry or bush plum
- Bush currant, Miconia calvescens, also called velvet tree or miconia
- Native currant, Leucopogon parviflorus also called coast beard-heath (native to Australia)
- Mahonia trifoliolata, called currant-of-Texas or wild currant

== Animals ==
- Currant pug, Eupithecia assimilata, moth of the family Geometridae
- Currant clearwing, Synanthedon tipuliformis, moth of the family Sesiidae

== People ==
- Bunny Currant (1911–2006), British fighter ace
- Simon Currant, Tasmanian tourism developer

== Places ==
- Currant, Nevada, settlement near Currant Mountain
- Currant Mountain, White Pine Range, Nevada, US

== Other ==
- Currant, the in-game currency for Glitch (video game)

== See also ==
- Current (disambiguation)
- Currant Events, Xanth series novel by Piers Anthony
- Searsia pyroides (formerly Rhus pyroides), or common currant-rhus, bush/tree in Southern Africa
