= Amy Guidry =

American painter (born 1976)

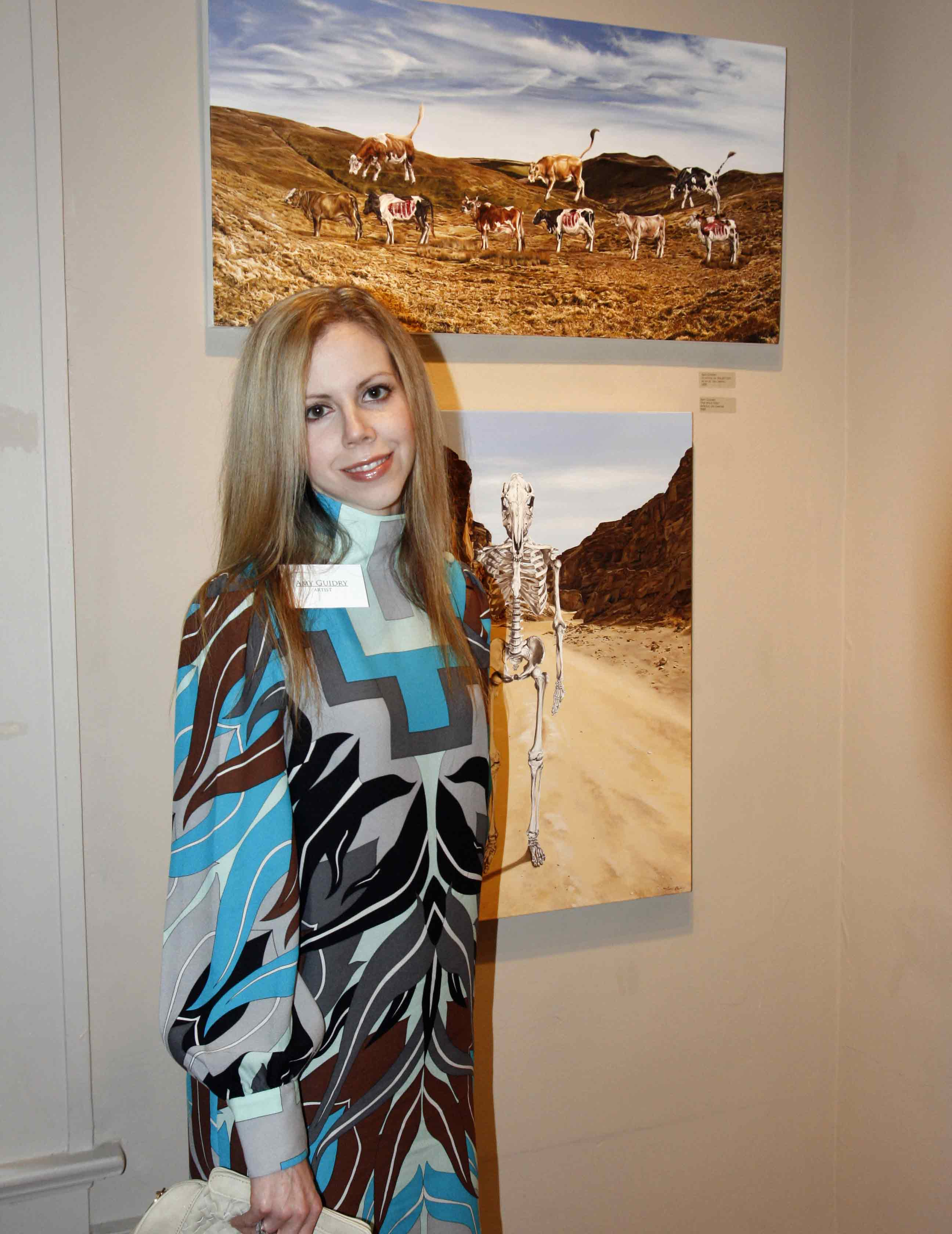
- Born: 1976 (age 49–50); Jacksonville, North Carolina, U.S.
- Education: Loyola University New Orleans
- Occupation: Artist

Amy Guidry (born 1976) is an American artist in Lafayette, Louisiana.

== Early life ==
She grew up in Slidell, Louisiana, a suburb of New Orleans. She attended Loyola University of New Orleans where she received her bachelor's degree in Visual Arts in 1998. She was also awarded the Loyola University Art Scholarship, which is only awarded to one student per graduating class.

== Career ==
Guidry's work has been exhibited in galleries and museums nationwide including the Visual Arts Center of New Jersey, the Alexandria Museum of Art, the Morehead State University Claypool-Young Art Gallery, Aljira a Center for Contemporary Art, the Acadiana Center for the Arts as well as Brandeis University and the Paul & Lulu Hilliard University Art Museum.

Her work is present in private and public collections including the Zigler Art Museum in Jennings, LA; the City of Slidell; and the Cedar Rapids Museum of Art in Cedar Rapids, IA. Guidry's paintings have been featured in publications such as Professional Artist, Studio Visit, and Adbusters. Her work has also been featured on MTV's The Real World, Season 20: Hollywood.

Guy Sangster Adams, editor of the UK publication Plectrum- The Cultural Pick, wrote, “Forget mere high definition, the exceptionality of Amy Guidry’s mix of photorealism and surrealism, creates a fantastic heightened definition that presents a hyperreality that forces one to address and, with hope, redress our reality.”
