= Lafayette Bayou Bulls =

The Lafayette Bayou Bulls is a semi-pro American football team that plays in Lafayette, Louisiana. They play under the Southern American Football League (SAFL) and are playing in the Kingoree Series at Baton Rouge Memorial Stadium. They have 2 SAFL championships under their belt and are looking for another one in 2007. Bill Verret was the General Manager 2004–2007, being awarded the General Manager of the Year in both 2004 and 2005.

== Season-by-season regular season records ==
Season records
| Season | W | L | T | Finish | Playoff results |
|---|---|---|---|---|---|
Lafayette Bayou Bulls
| 2003 | 9 | 4 | 1 | Only 1st Round Win | -- |
| 2004 | 10 | 3 | 0 | King Bowl Win vs. Port Arthur Hurricanes | 3–0 |
| 2005 | 3 | 2 | 0 | King Bowl Loss vs. Baton Rouge Riverboat Bandits | 1–1 |
| 2006 | 4 | 6 | 0 | 1st Round Loss vs. Louisiana Storm Chasers | 0–1 |
| 2007 | 6 | 4 | 0 | 1st Round Loss vs. SW Louisiana Spartans | 0–1 |
| 2008 | 6 | 4 | 0 | 1st Round Loss vs. Greater N.O. Gladiators | 0–1 |
| Totals | 38 | 23 | 1 | (regular season records only) | |
