= A Current Affair =

A Current Affair may refer to:

- A Current Affair (Australian TV program), 1971–present Australian current affairs program that airs on Nine Network
- A Current Affair (American TV program), a 1986–1998 American television newsmagazine program that aired in syndication, and was revived in 2005

== See also ==
- Current affairs (disambiguation)
