= Old Lafayette City Hall =

- U.S. National Register of Historic Places
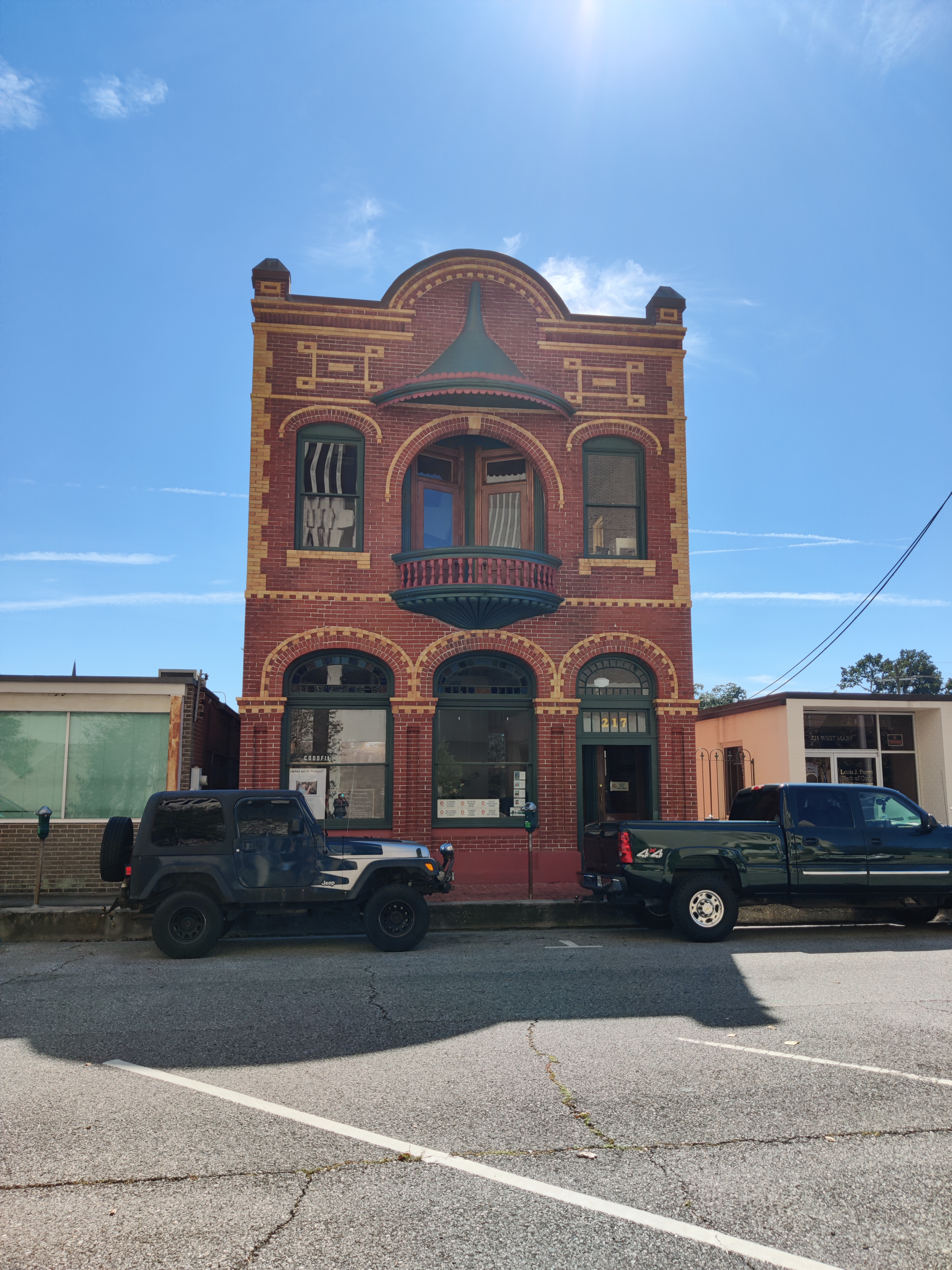

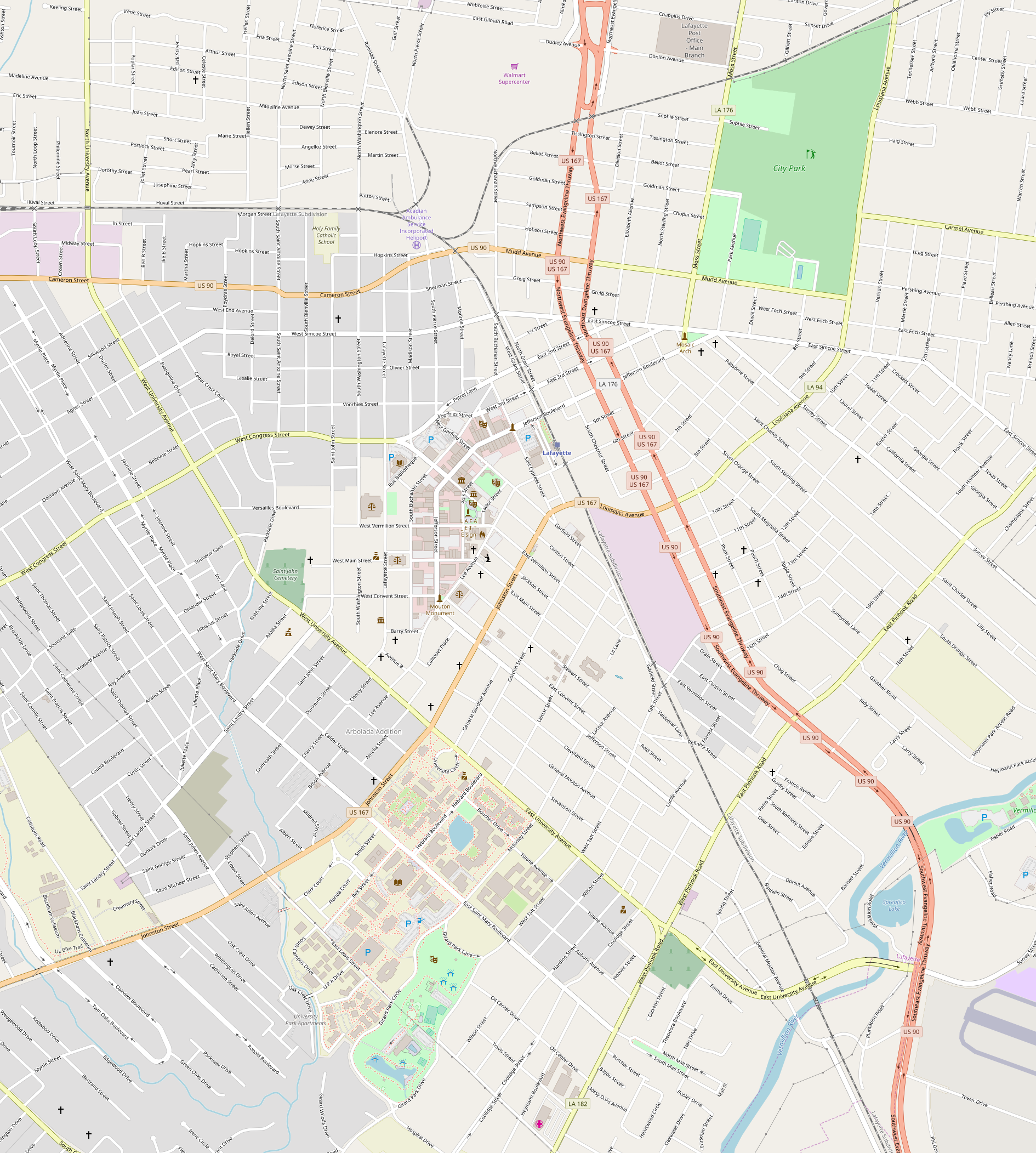
- Location within Lafayette
- Location: 217 West Main Street, Lafayette, Louisiana
- Coordinates: 30°13′21″N 92°01′14″W
- Area: less than one acre
- Built: 1898
- Architect: George Knapp
- NRHP reference No.: 75000851
- Added to NRHP: June 10, 1975

The Old Lafayette City Hall is a historic institutional building located at 217 West Main Street in Lafayette, Louisiana, United States. The building, constructed on a small parcel of land, is a typical two-story masonry Commercial building with some Rococo elements. The second floor facade has a balcony with a semi-circular brick arch above.

== History ==
Designed by architect George Knapp of Lafayette, the building was erected in 1898 and originally hosted the Bank of Lafayette. On June 26, 1906, the building was sold to the "Corporation of the town of Lafayette" for $4,500. In 1908 a prison was added to the rear of the building. The building was used as the city hall until 1939, when a larger city hall was finally built. The ground floor was then used by local women's organizations and as a library. Until 1972 other institutional agencies were hosted in the building. In 1972 the building was declared unfit for occupancy.

The building was listed on the National Register of Historic Places on June 10, 1975.

== See also ==
- National Register of Historic Places listings in Lafayette Parish, Louisiana
