= Current affairs =

Current affairs may refer to:

== News ==
- Current Affairs (magazine), a bimonthly American magazine of culture and politics.
- Current affairs (news format), a genre of broadcast journalism
- Current Affairs, former name for Behind the News, an Australian program

== Politics ==
- An approximate synonym for current events
- An approximate synonym for politics

== Other uses ==
- "Current Affairs", a song by Zion I and The Grouch from Heroes in the City of Dope (2006)
- "Current Affairs", a song by Lorde from Virgin (2025)

== See also ==
- A Current Affair (disambiguation)
