= IBM Current =

IBM Current 1.1 was a Microsoft Windows 1.0-based graphical user interface relational database/personal information manager, introduced in 1990. It was revised as a software package called Commence by Jensen-Jones Inc., and included some of the features of ACT! and FileMaker Pro.

== Uses ==
If the user defined a meeting, the meeting could have attributes in related tables showing the meeting location, the persons invited, the tasks pertaining to the meeting and which projects they were associated with, any records in a document log related to these, and any notes stored in the system. The user did not need to type the location because it was already stored in a table of meeting rooms. Instead, location was picked from a scrollable list.

It also had some Microsoft-Project-like project management features. The package comes pre-configured to do Gantt charts and mark milestones or tasks on daily calendars. The Gantt charts are assembled by Current based on tasks the user defines as being part of a project. The tasks are assigned to persons using a scrollable list and linked to a project through a database relationship. While less sophisticated and less graphically interesting than Gantt charts produced by modern software, the output was coherent and usable.

Current also supported Microsoft's Dynamic Data Exchange (DDE). A usable file import-export capability was included. The system could do outlines, mail merge from its own addresses, and allowed the user to change colors of display elements.

The basic system woke up with a calendar display. It could look like a day planner view or a month calendar. The user could go to an address book which was designed to be a screen-based metaphor for a paper address book. Current could dial phone calls from your address book if you had a modem attached to the system. There were screens for tracking expenses, (which could be associated with a project, naturally). There were also to-do lists which might, or might not, relate to other tasks or projects at the user's whim.

A little before its time, Current's IBM-provided reports and screen forms could be modified by the user. The system allowed the creation of user-defined database fields if the native table did not contain a needed field. The fields could be associated with one of several tables and one-to-many relationships are supported. For example, many phone numbers can be associated with one person. That person can be tied to many projects and also to one or more company entities. Much of this modeling was in place at installation. If one needed more, the application supports advanced modeling of data beyond what an average user would bother to implement. Many entries in the system are populated automatically through the internal relationships. Most entries required the user to scroll through a list and select an item. The system must have been among the first to support images, such as photos of persons.

A firm named Jensen-Jones, later renamed Commence Corporation, developed the software.

== System requirements ==
Program documentation dated June 15, 1990 included a run-time version of Microsoft Windows 2.0 which would support a single application. This was called "Windows Single Application Environment," (SAE). The minimum hardware a user needed was an 80286-based system with 640KB of RAM, running DOS 3.3 or newer, and having an EGA color display.

== Modern systems ==
The file compression scheme used by the installation routine does not work in modern Windows operating systems. If the program were installed in an older Windows 3.1 system, it can be manually zipped then moved to a Windows 9x or NT-based system and will work properly under the 16-bit WOWEXEC.

While the program pre-dated the introduction of Windows 3 and True-Type, it is otherwise compatible with a modern installation of Windows XP. The user has only a single system font in all screen displays and printed output. On some systems, the display screens displayed incorrectly, because the system's default font was sized differently than the default Windows 2.0 system font.

If the application were installed on a file server or mapped drive, a single user at a time can use it over the network with no difficulties.
