= Lafayette, Louisiana =

Lafayette
- Consolidated city-parish
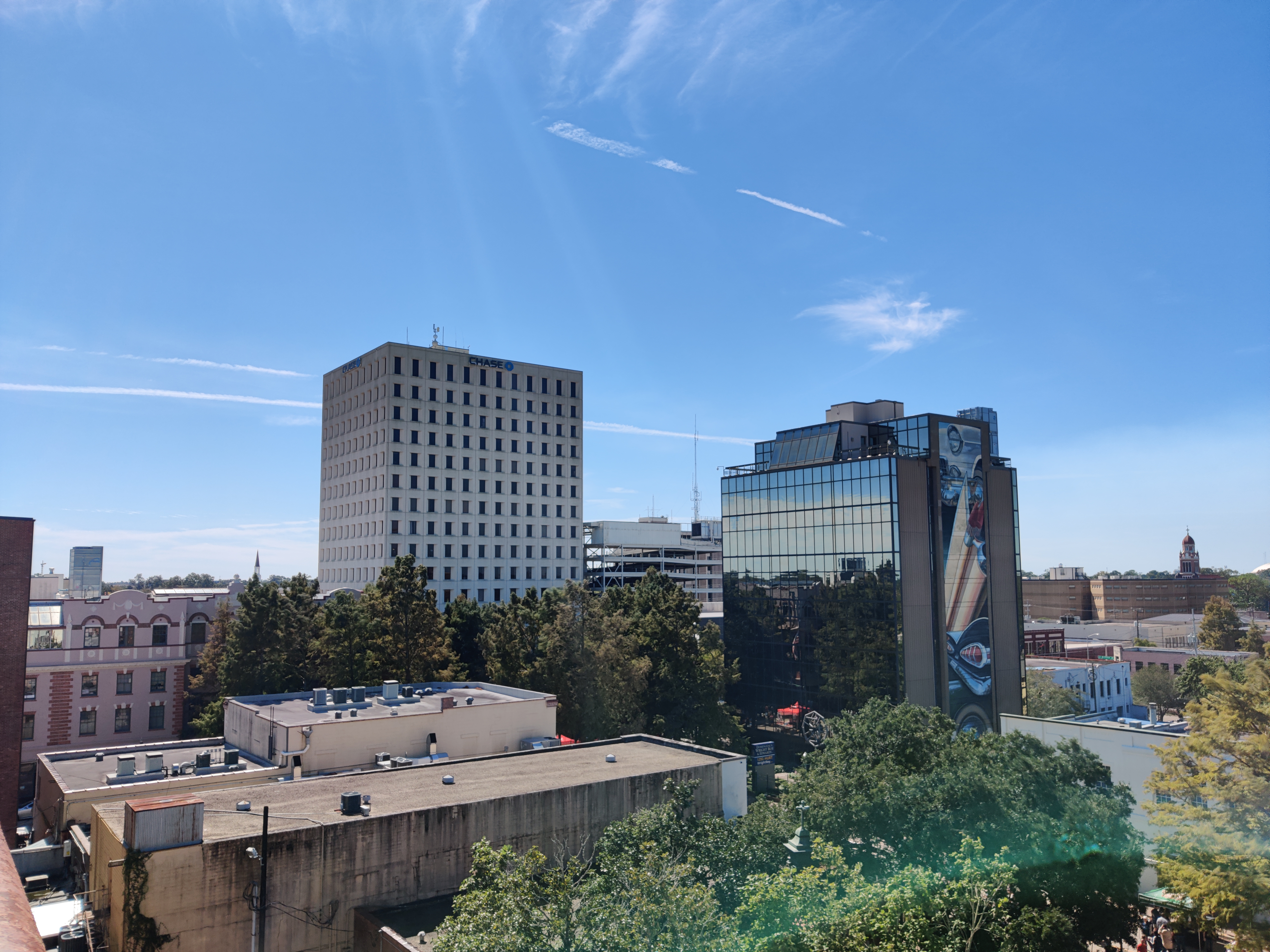
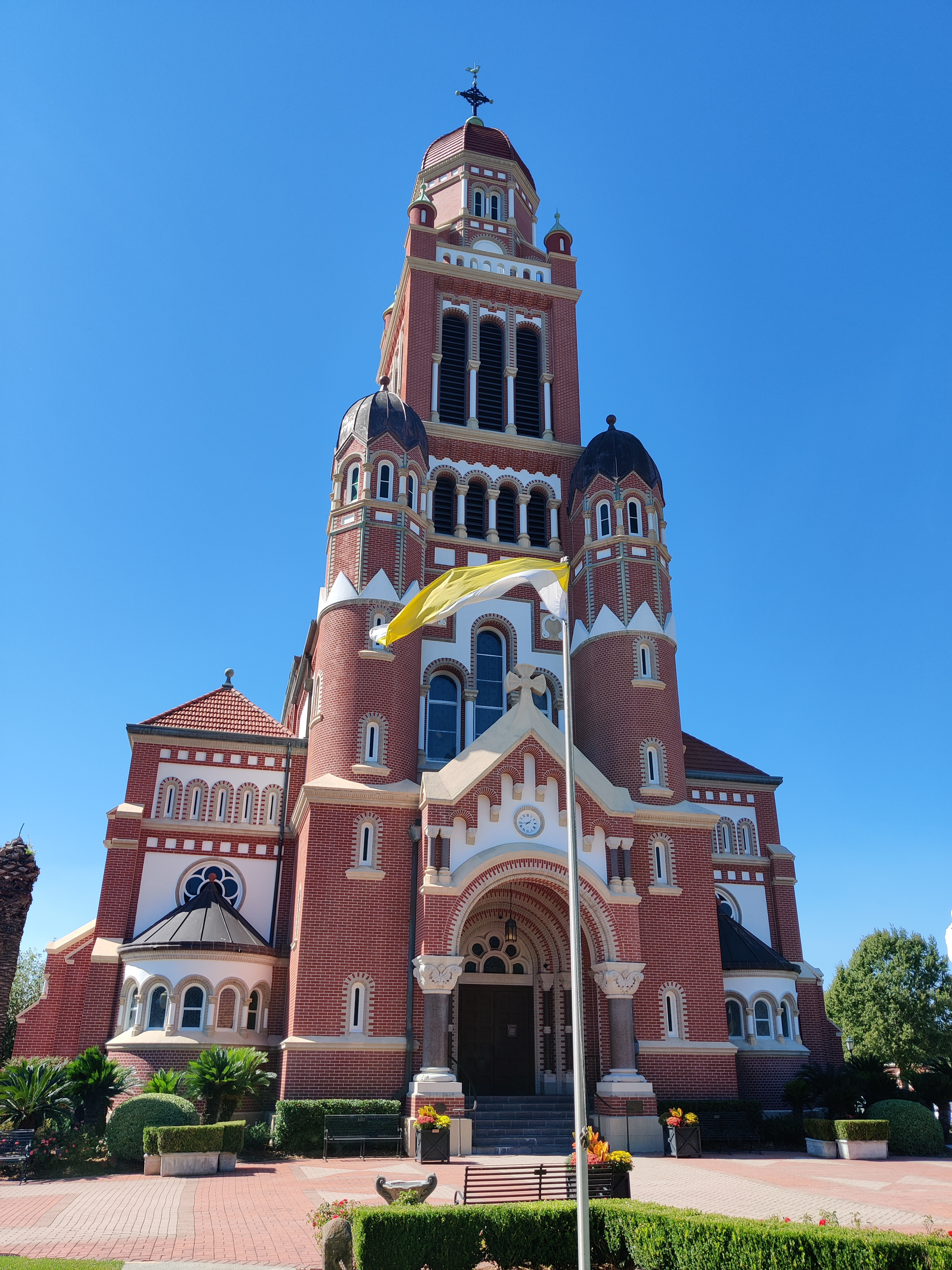
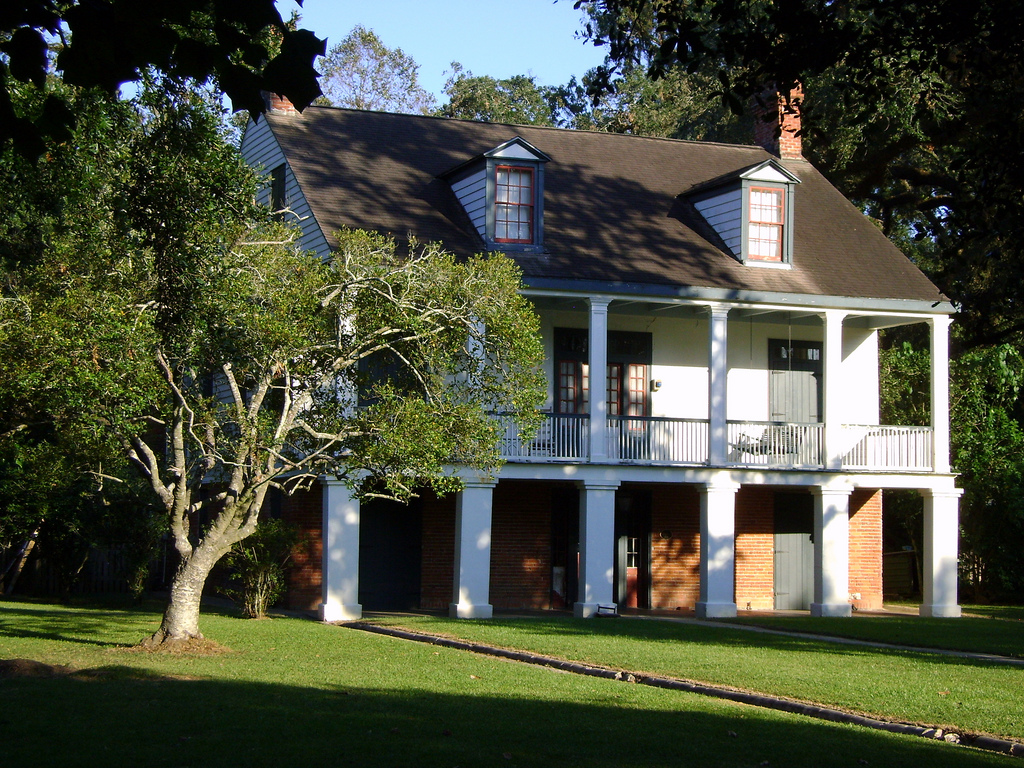
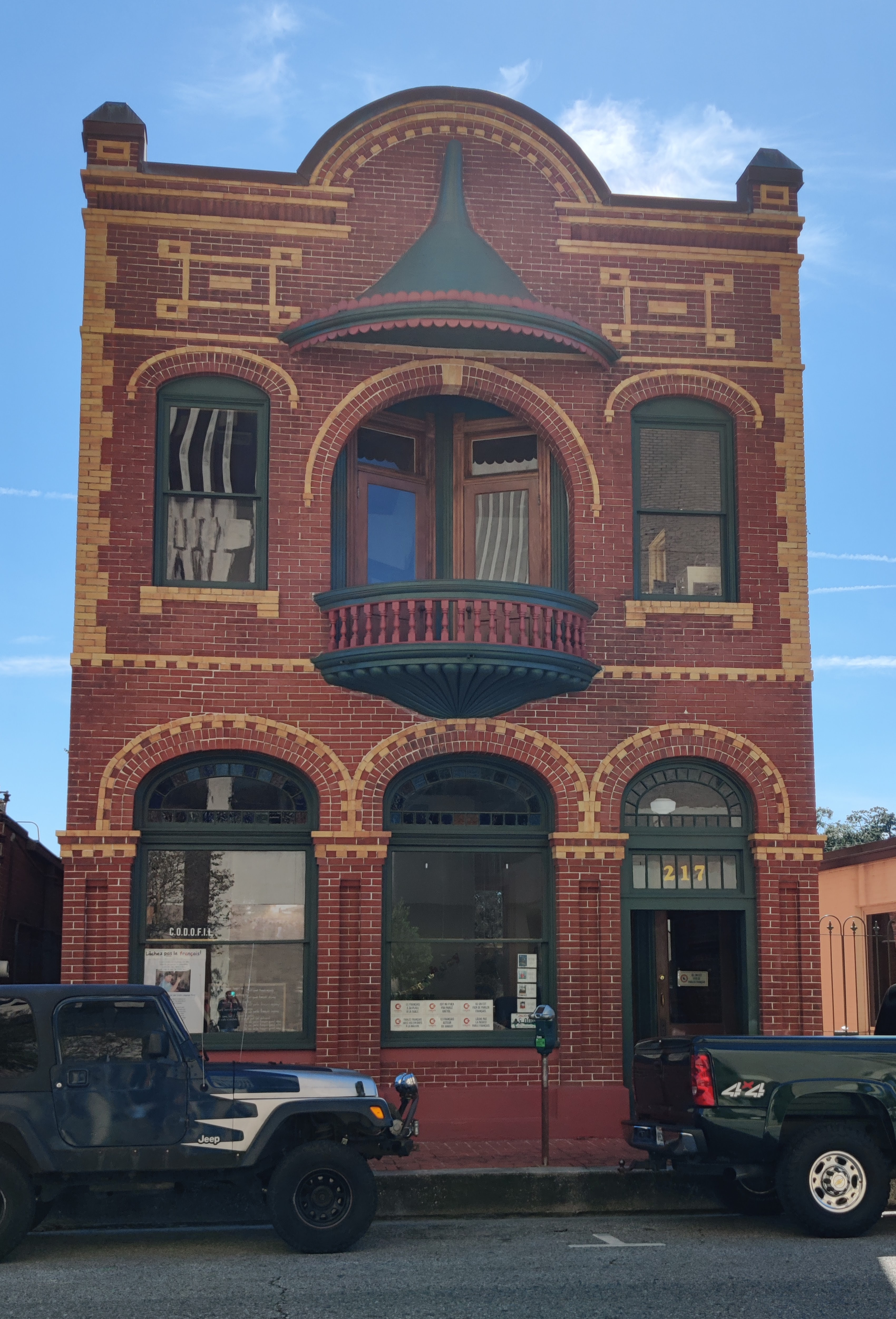
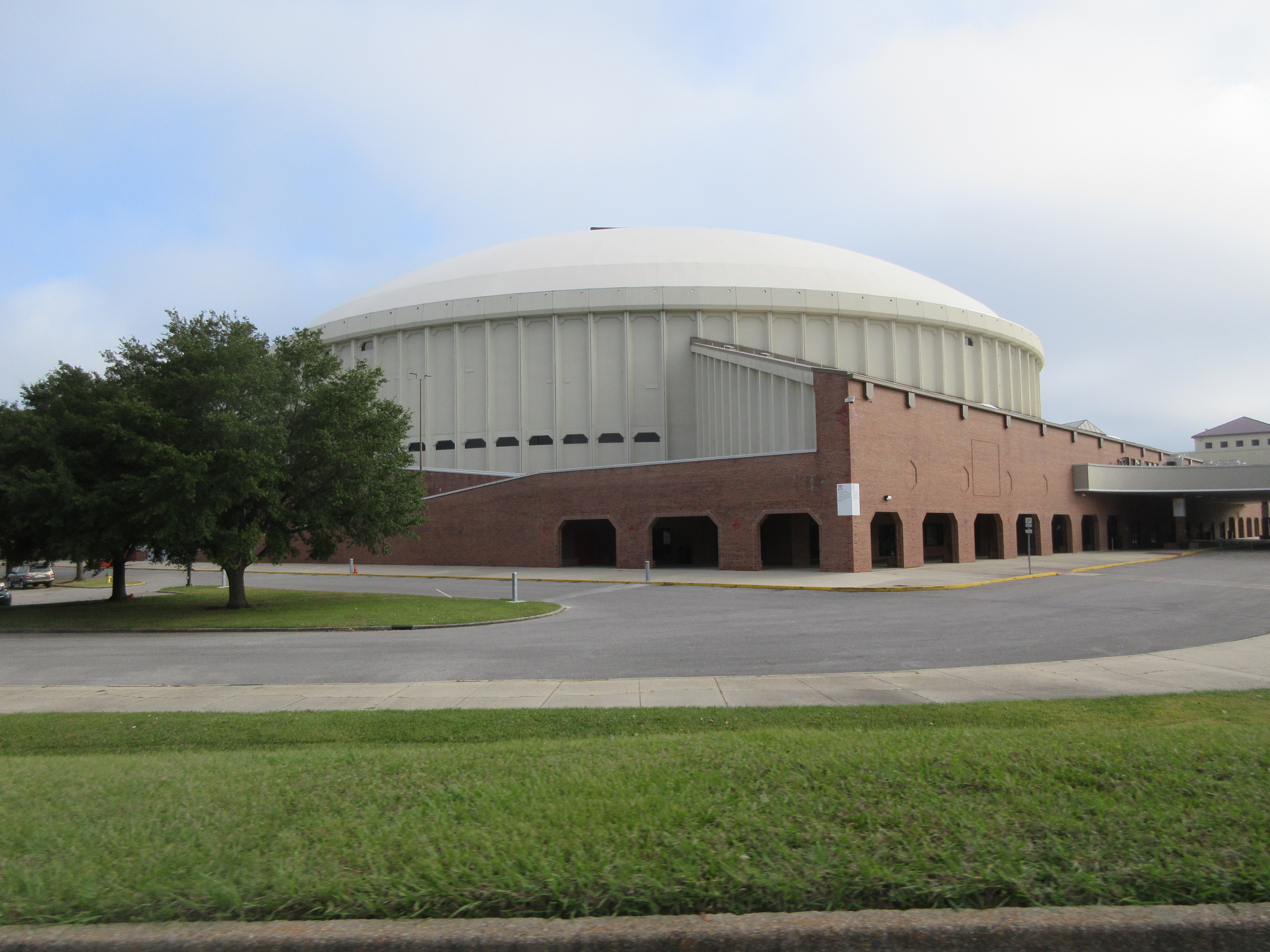
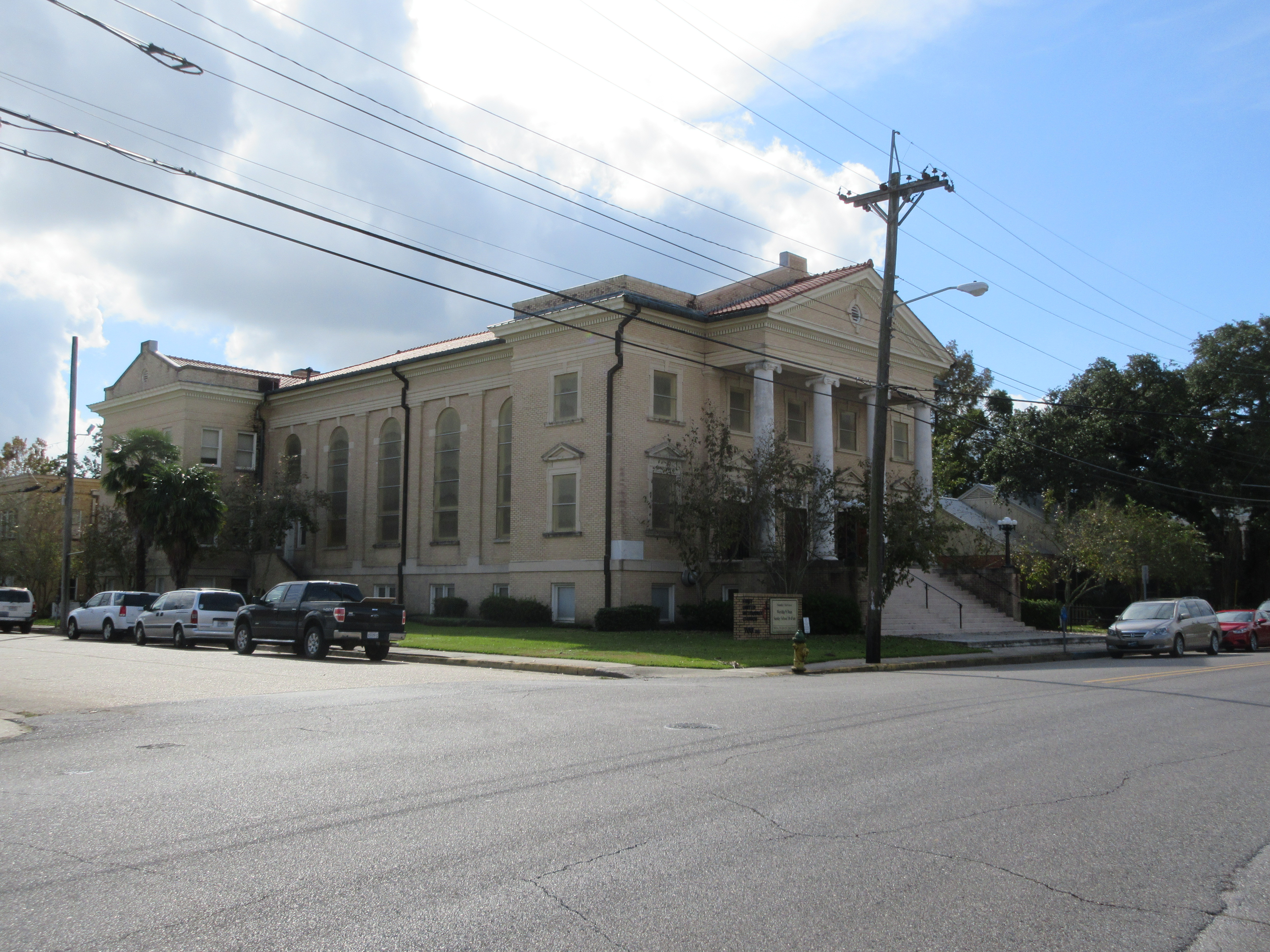
- Downtown St. John the Evangelist's Cathedral Charles H. Mouton House Old Lafayette City Hall Cajundome First United Methodist Church

- Seal Logo
- Nickname: The Hub City
- Motto: The Heart of Cajun Country
- Interactive map of Lafayette
- Location within Louisiana Location within the United States
- Coordinates: 30°13′27″N 92°1′8″W
- Country: United States
- State: Louisiana
- Parish: Lafayette
- Founded: 1821 (205 years ago) as Vermilionville
- Renamed: 1884 (142 years ago) as Lafayette
- Founder: Jean Mouton
- Named for: General Gilbert du Motier, Marquis de Lafayette

Government
  - Type: Consolidated city–parish
  - Mayor: Monique Blanco-Boulet (R)

Area
  - Consolidated city-parish: 56.00 sq mi (145.03 km^{2})
  - Land: 55.92 sq mi (144.83 km^{2})
  - Water: 0.077 sq mi (0.20 km^{2})
- Elevation: 23 ft (7.0 m)

Population (2020)
  - Consolidated city-parish: 121,374
  - Rank: US: 234th
  - Density: 2,170.6/sq mi (838.07/km^{2})
  - Urban: 227,316 (US: 172nd)
  - Urban density: 1,410.1/sq mi (544.4/km^{2})
  - Metro: 478,384 (US: 118th)
  - CSA: 627,146 (US: 77th)
  - Consolidated: 244,390
- Demonym: Lafayettien
- Time zone: UTC−6 (CST)
  - Summer (DST): UTC−5 (CDT)
- ZIP codes: 70501–9, 70593, 70596, 70598
- Area code: 337
- FIPS code: 22-40735
- GNIS feature ID: 2404854
- Website: www.lafayettela.gov

Lafayette (/ˌlæfiˈjɛt, ˌlɑːf-/ LA(H)-fee-YET, French: [lafajɛt]) is a city in Louisiana and the parish seat of Lafayette Parish. It is located along the Vermilion River. It is Louisiana's fourth-most populous city with a 2020 census population of 121,374; the consolidated city-parish's population was 241,753 in 2020. The Lafayette metropolitan area was Louisiana's third largest metropolitan statistical area with a population of 478,384 at the 2020 census. The Acadiana region containing Lafayette is the largest population and economic corridor between Houston, Texas and New Orleans.

Originally established as Vermilionville in the 1820s and incorporated in 1836, Lafayette developed as an agricultural community until the introduction of retail and entertainment centers, and the discovery of oil in the area in the 1940s. Since the discovery of oil, the city and parish have had the highest number of workers in the oil and natural gas industry in Louisiana as of 2018. With the issuance of a bond ordinance for a series of roads connecting nearby settlements, the establishment of the University of Louisiana System's Lafayette campus, and the continued diversification of its economy, Lafayette and its metropolitan area have experienced population growth since the 1840 census, with the city being called "The Hub City." The city and parish of Lafayette are also known as the "Heart of Acadiana."

As a result of its growth, the city and region have become major centers for the technology industry; Lafayette has also become a major center for health care and social services, aerospace, banking, and retail. Notable corporations with headquarters or a large presence in the Lafayette area include Amazon, Brookshire Grocery Company, CGI, JP Morgan Chase, Ochsner Health System, Petroleum Helicopters International, and Rouses Markets.

Lafayette is home to a diverse population from Louisiana Creole and Cajun backgrounds. The city and region's cultural icons include Alexandre Mouton House, Brandt House, Charles H. Mouton House, the Cathedral of Saint John the Evangelist, Daigle House, First United Methodist Church, Holy Rosary Institute, Hope Lodge No. 145, and Old Lafayette City Hall. Its educational institutions include the University of Louisiana at Lafayette, South Louisiana Community College, and Remington College.

== Etymology ==
Lafayette is named after Marquis de Lafayette. Little is known about early settlements or if the area had a different name prior to European colonization. The city was originally founded in 1821 as Vermilionville.

== History ==
=== Colonization and settlement ===
The Attakapa Native Americans inhabited this area at the time of the first European encounter. French colonists founded the first European settlement, Petit Manchac, a trading post along the Vermilion River. In the mid-to-late eighteenth century, numerous Acadian refugees settled in this area, after being expelled from Canada after Great Britain defeated France in the Seven Years' War. They intermarried with other settlers, forming what became known as Cajun culture, which maintained use of the French language and adherence to the Roman Catholic Church.

=== Municipal incorporation ===
Jean Mouton, an Acadian settler, donated land to the Roman Church for construction of a small Catholic chapel at this site. In 1824, this area was selected for the Lafayette Parish seat and was named Vermilionville, for its location on the river; in 1836, the Louisiana State Legislature approved its incorporation.

The area was initially developed by Europeans for agriculture, primarily sugar plantations, which depended on the labor of numerous enslaved Africans and African Americans. They made up a large percentage of the antebellum population. According to U.S. census data in 1830, some 41 percent of the population of Lafayette Parish was enslaved. By 1860, the enslaved population had increased to 49.6 percent. Some free people of color lived in Lafayette Parish, as well; they made up 3 percent to a low of 2.4 percent between 1830 and 1860.

In 1884, Vermilionville was renamed for General Lafayette, a French aristocrat who had fought with and significantly aided the Continental Army during the American Revolutionary War. The city and parish economy continued to be based on agriculture into the early 20th century. After the American Civil War, most of the labor was done by freedmen, who worked as sharecroppers. From the 1930s, mechanization of agriculture began to reduce the need for farm workers.

=== Growth and consolidation ===
By 1898, the University of Louisiana at Lafayette was established in the city as the Southwestern Louisiana Industrial Institute. It opened in 1901, and changed its name to the University of Southwestern Louisiana in 1960. The university's current name was chosen in 1999.

In the 1940s, after oil was discovered in the parish, the petroleum and natural gas industries expanded to dominate the economy. By 2018, Lafayette had the highest number of oil and natural gas industry workers in the state.

Since the latter half of the 20th century, Lafayette has hosted the Festivals Acadiens et Créoles, and was candidate as site for the New Orleans Pelicans NBA G League team in 2017.

In 1996, the city and parish consolidated; the governments of the city and parish were merged, though five other incorporated municipalities continued to operate with their own municipal governments and departments. Since the beginning of the 21st century, a committee proposed the deconsolidation of the city and parish. In 2014, Lafayette was named the "Happiest City in America.”

In 2015, the city of Lafayette gained international attention for a mass shooting and murder-suicide at Grand 16 Theater; this mass shooting spurred further discussion and debate on gun control in the United States. During 2015, the Lafayette metropolitan area also overtook the Shreveport–Bossier City metropolitan area by population, becoming Louisiana's third largest metropolitan region. The city of Lafayette experienced the largest number of homicides in its recorded history in 2023.

== Geography ==
The city of Lafayette is located in southern Louisiana's Acadiana region on the Gulf Coast of the United States. It was part of the seabed during the earlier Quaternary period. During this time, the Mississippi River cut a 325-foot-deep (99 m) valley between what is now Lafayette and Baton Rouge. This valley was filled and is now the Atchafalaya Basin. The city is located on the western rim of this valley.

The Lafayette area is part of the southwestern Louisiana Prairie Terrace; it is higher and not made of wetlands like much of the surrounding areas to the south and west of Lafayette. Lafayette does not suffer significant flooding problems, outside of local flash flooding. Lafayette has developed on both sides of the Vermilion River. Other significant waterways in the city are Isaac Verot Coulee, Coulee Mine, Coulee des Poches, and Coulee Ile des Cannes, which are natural drainage canals that lead to the Vermilion River.

Lafayette lies approximately 135 miles (217 km) from New Orleans, 59 miles (95 km) from the state capital of Baton Rouge, 75 miles (121 km) from Lake Charles, and 89 miles (143 km) from Alexandria. The city has an elevation ranging from 36 feet (11.0 m) to 49 feet (15 m) above sea level. According to the United States Census Bureau, the city has a total area of 55.65 square miles (144.1 km^{2}), of which 55.57 square miles (143.9 km^{2}) is land and 0.08 sq mi (0.21 km^{2}) (0.19 percent) is covered by water.

=== Cityscape ===
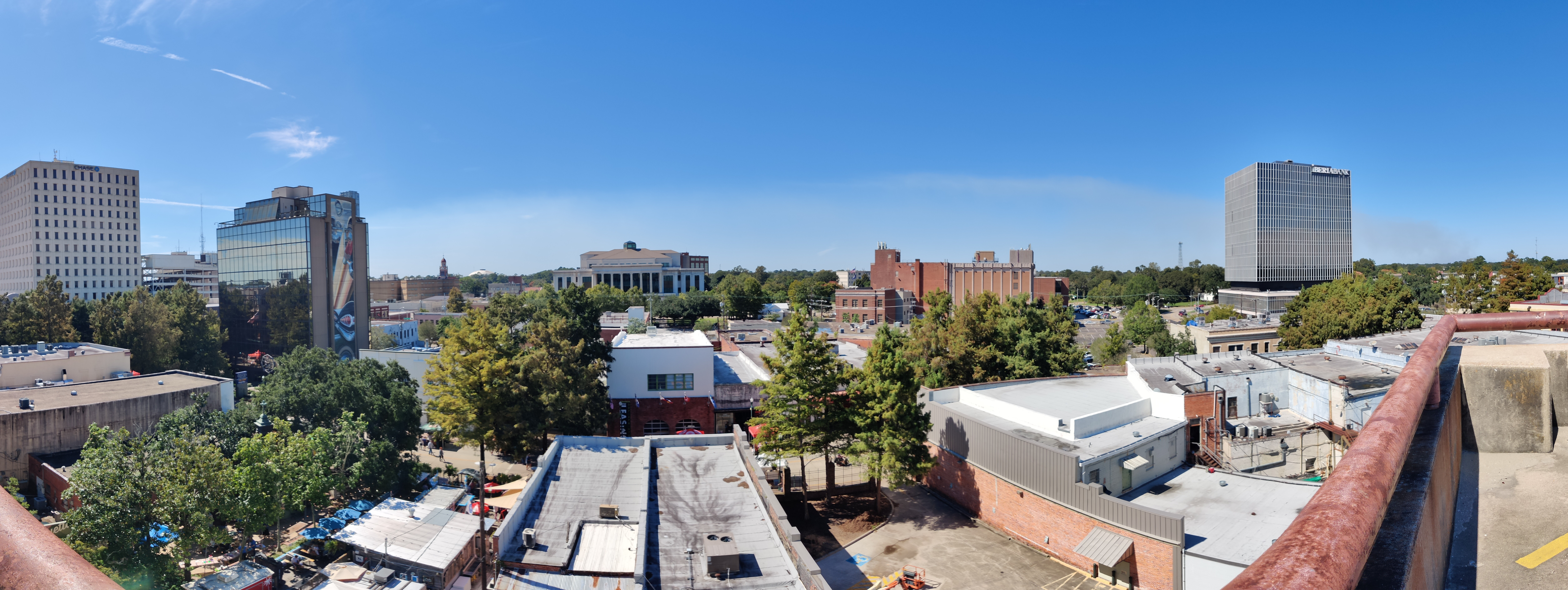
Panorama of Downtown Lafayette (2021)

The city of Lafayette's architecture is diverse, with a collection of more than eight downtown structures listed within the National Register of Historic Places. Downtown Lafayette landmarks include Old Lafayette City Hall and the Cathedral of Saint John the Evangelist. Near these structures, Chase and Doubletree have been the area's tallest buildings at 15 and 16 stories.

With the announcement of the latest addition to the city in over 40 years, two high-rise towers were planned and would stand 4 stories higher. In October 2021, it was announced only one high-rise tower would be constructed citing lack of interest in condominiums within the area; the project was halted in January 2022 citing further difficulties. The attempted construction of new high-rises within the heart of the city followed efforts to redevelop the downtown area in the 2010s and attract further residents. Alongside high-rise construction projects throughout the downtown area, a 70-unit apartment development began in early 2022 spurring continued interest in urban development.

=== Climate ===
Lafayette's climate is described as humid subtropical using Köppen climate classification. It has year-round precipitation, especially during summertime. Lafayette's highest temperature was 110 °F (43 °C) on August 27, 2023 and the lowest temperature was 4 °F (−16 °C) on January 22, 2025; it has hot, moist summers and warm, damp winters.

Climate data for Lafayette Regional Airport, Louisiana (1991–2020 normals, extremes 1893–present)
| Month | Jan | Feb | Mar | Apr | May | Jun | Jul | Aug | Sep | Oct | Nov | Dec | Year |
|---|---|---|---|---|---|---|---|---|---|---|---|---|---|
| Record high °F (°C) | 87 (31) | 87 (31) | 93 (34) | 93 (34) | 98 (37) | 106 (41) | 107 (42) | 110 (43) | 103 (39) | 98 (37) | 92 (33) | 89 (32) | 110 (43) |
| Mean maximum °F (°C) | 76.4 (24.7) | 78.1 (25.6) | 82.7 (28.2) | 86.9 (30.5) | 92.0 (33.3) | 95.3 (35.2) | 96.6 (35.9) | 97.6 (36.4) | 94.9 (34.9) | 90.4 (32.4) | 83.7 (28.7) | 79.1 (26.2) | 98.3 (36.8) |
| Mean daily maximum °F (°C) | 62.2 (16.8) | 66.1 (18.9) | 72.6 (22.6) | 79.0 (26.1) | 85.9 (29.9) | 90.2 (32.3) | 91.5 (33.1) | 92.3 (33.5) | 89.0 (31.7) | 81.3 (27.4) | 71.5 (21.9) | 64.4 (18.0) | 78.8 (26.0) |
| Daily mean °F (°C) | 52.8 (11.6) | 56.8 (13.8) | 62.9 (17.2) | 69.2 (20.7) | 76.5 (24.7) | 81.6 (27.6) | 83.3 (28.5) | 83.5 (28.6) | 79.7 (26.5) | 70.7 (21.5) | 60.8 (16.0) | 54.9 (12.7) | 69.4 (20.8) |
| Mean daily minimum °F (°C) | 43.5 (6.4) | 47.4 (8.6) | 53.3 (11.8) | 59.3 (15.2) | 67.2 (19.6) | 73.1 (22.8) | 75.1 (23.9) | 74.7 (23.7) | 70.4 (21.3) | 60.1 (15.6) | 50.2 (10.1) | 45.3 (7.4) | 60.0 (15.6) |
| Mean minimum °F (°C) | 26.4 (−3.1) | 32.0 (0.0) | 35.1 (1.7) | 42.7 (5.9) | 54.3 (12.4) | 66.0 (18.9) | 70.6 (21.4) | 69.1 (20.6) | 57.9 (14.4) | 42.8 (6.0) | 33.0 (0.6) | 29.2 (−1.6) | 24.6 (−4.1) |
| Record low °F (°C) | 4 (−16) | 6 (−14) | 22 (−6) | 32 (0) | 42 (6) | 51 (11) | 59 (15) | 58 (14) | 41 (5) | 27 (−3) | 21 (−6) | 9 (−13) | 4 (−16) |
| Average precipitation inches (mm) | 5.92 (150) | 4.07 (103) | 3.72 (94) | 4.91 (125) | 5.44 (138) | 7.09 (180) | 6.27 (159) | 6.26 (159) | 5.02 (128) | 4.76 (121) | 4.39 (112) | 4.96 (126) | 62.81 (1,595) |
| Average precipitation days (≥ 0.01 in) | 10.0 | 9.3 | 8.7 | 7.5 | 8.4 | 12.2 | 14.1 | 12.2 | 9.4 | 7.6 | 8.3 | 9.8 | 117.5 |
Source: NOAA

== Demographics ==
Historical population
| Census | Pop. | Note | %± |
|---|---|---|---|
| 1860 | 498 | | — |
| 1870 | 777 | | 56.0% |
| 1880 | 815 | | 4.9% |
| 1890 | 2,106 | | 158.4% |
| 1900 | 3,314 | | 57.4% |
| 1910 | 6,392 | | 92.9% |
| 1920 | 7,855 | | 22.9% |
| 1930 | 14,635 | | 86.3% |
| 1940 | 19,210 | | 31.3% |
| 1950 | 33,541 | | 74.6% |
| 1960 | 40,400 | | 20.4% |
| 1970 | 68,908 | | 70.6% |
| 1980 | 80,584 | | 16.9% |
| 1990 | 94,440 | | 17.2% |
| 2000 | 110,257 | | 16.7% |
| 2010 | 120,623 | | 9.4% |
| 2020 | 121,374 | | 0.6% |
| 2025 (est.) | 123,311 | ▲ | 1.6% |
U.S. Decennial Census

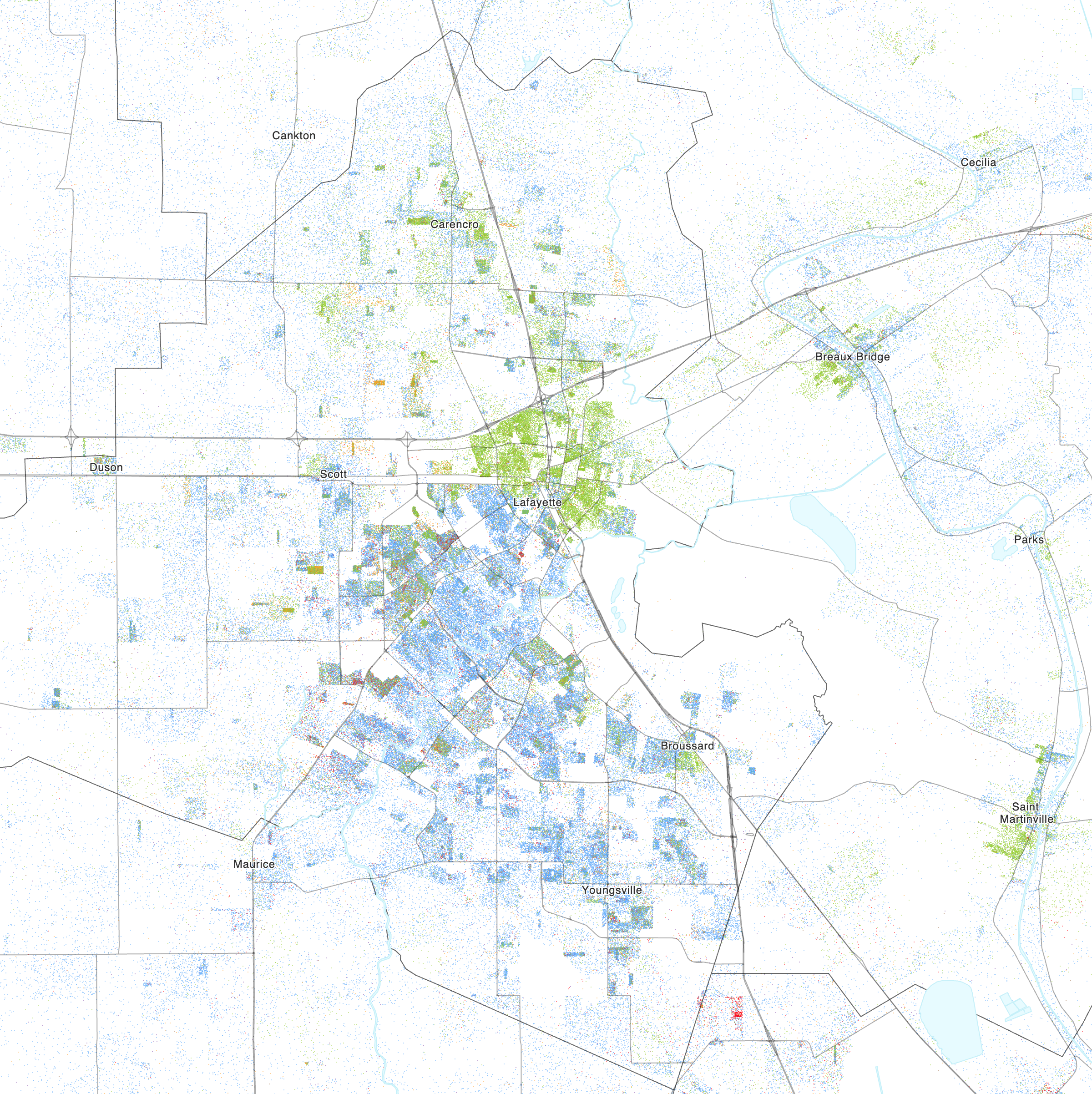
Map of racial distribution in Lafayette, 2020 U.S. census. Each dot is one person: ⬤ White ⬤ Black ⬤ Asian ⬤ Hispanic ⬤ Multiracial ⬤ Native American/Other

Lafayette, Louisiana – Racial and ethnic composition Note: the US Census treats Hispanic/Latino as an ethnic category. This table excludes Latinos from the racial categories and assigns them to a separate category. Hispanics/Latinos may be of any race.
| Race / Ethnicity (NH = Non-Hispanic) | Pop 2000 | Pop 2010 | Pop 2020 | % 2000 | % 2010 | % 2020 |
|---|---|---|---|---|---|---|
| White alone (NH) | 74,020 | 74,424 | 69,117 | 67.13% | 61.70% | 56.95% |
| Black or African American alone (NH) | 31,292 | 37,255 | 37,025 | 28.38% | 30.89% | 30.50% |
| Native American or Alaska Native alone (NH) | 250 | 350 | 344 | 0.23% | 0.29% | 0.28% |
| Asian alone (NH) | 1,573 | 2,162 | 3,136 | 1.43% | 1.79% | 2.58% |
| Pacific Islander alone (NH) | 24 | 29 | 33 | 0.02% | 0.02% | 0.03% |
| Some Other Race alone (NH) | 135 | 227 | 457 | 0.12% | 0.19% | 0.38% |
| Mixed Race or Multi-Racial (NH) | 892 | 1,645 | 3,731 | 0.81% | 1.36% | 3.07% |
| Hispanic or Latino (any race) | 2,071 | 4,531 | 7,531 | 1.88% | 3.76% | 6.20% |
| Total | 110,257 | 120,623 | 121,374 | 100.00% | 100.00% | 100.00% |

Attakapa Native Americans were originally the primary residents of the Lafayette area before French colonization, concentrated along the Vermilion River. After the Louisiana Purchase, American settlers began moving into the area and intermarrying among the French, enslaved Africans, and free people of color. Since 1860, Lafayette has grown from 498 to 121,374 residents at the 2020 U.S. census. Following the American Community Survey's 5 year estimates program, the city has continued population growth with an additional 2020 estimate at 126,674 residents.

With the migration and population growth of European, African, and multiracial Americans since early settlement, the racial and ethnic makeup of the city has been predominantly non-Hispanic or Latino white, Black or African American, multiracial, and Asian. French, German, English, American, Irish, and Italian were the largest European ancestry groups among the non-Hispanic or Latino white population. Asian settlers arrived during the establishment of Filipino communities along the coast of Louisiana (primarily in the Greater New Orleans area) up to established communities in the Acadiana region as of 2013. The city and area's Hispanic and Latino American population have existed since Spanish colonization of Louisiana.

According to 2021 estimates from the U.S. Census Bureau, its non-Hispanic or Latino white population have been prevalent throughout the city proper's geographic foothold with exception to its northern neighborhoods. More than 34% of its Hispanic and Latino American population lived in the central-west portion of the city, and Black and African Americans primarily dominated the northern half of Lafayette city proper. Its Asian American community was dispersed throughout the whole city alongside multiracial Americans, and people of other races and ethnicities primarily lived near downtown or the city's border with Carencro.

Having historic growth from the 20th and 21st centuries attributed primarily to the oil and gas industry, the University of Louisiana at Lafayette, and Acadiana tourism, an estimated 3.8 percent of the city's population was foreign-born from 2014 to 2019; of the foreign-born population, 33.6 percent were naturalized U.S. citizens. Altogether English, French, and Spanish were the most spoken languages at home among the native and foreign-born populations. In 2022, the city's foreign-born population grew to 5.8%.

Poverty remains an issue in the city with an estimated 18.6 percent at or below the national poverty threshold in 2019, the median income for a family was $54,139 in 2020 and Lafayettiens had a mean household income of $79,216; among non-family households, the median income stood at $34,588. The city had an employment rate of 60.4 percent, up from the state's 55.4 percent from 2014 to 2019.

=== Sexual orientation and gender identity ===
While in the predominantly conservative southern U.S., Lafayette has maintained a substantial lesbian, gay, bisexual, and transgender community since at least 1969, when some members of the Mystic Krewe of Apollo, a gay cultural, social, and service organization in New Orleans, arrived in the city. The area's LGBT population have described Acadiana as "welcoming," though some members of the community in the 1970s declined to be photographed at public and private LGBT events. While regarded as welcoming, Lafayette's government was once under the Human Rights Campaign Foundation's focus regarding non-discrimination in city employment; a local government spokesperson responded with reports of no complaints from the local LGBT community. In 2023, the community celebrated the second annual Pride Acadiana.

=== Religion ===
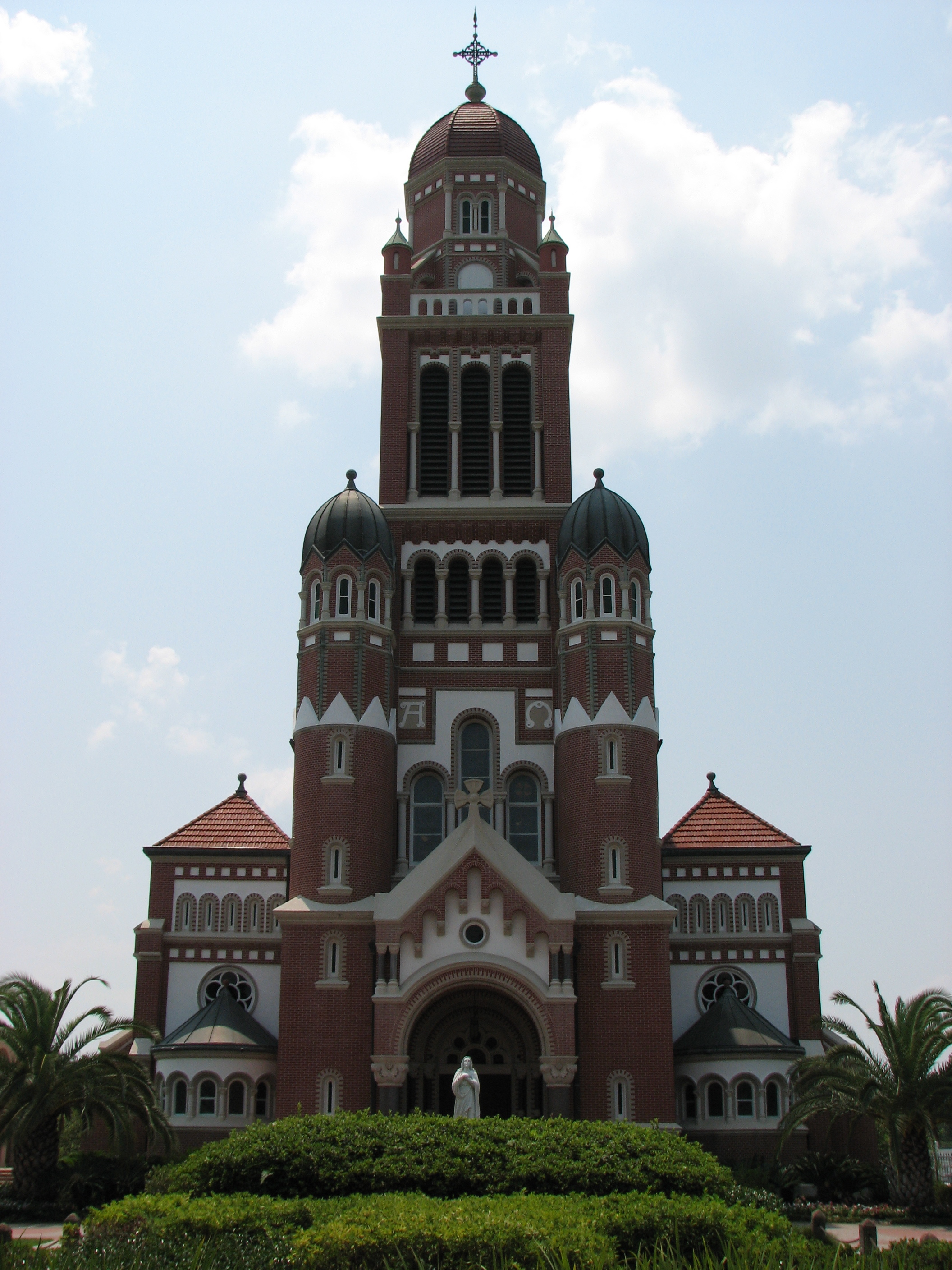
St. John's Cathedral, see of the Diocese of Lafayette in Louisiana

In common with Louisiana's religious demographic, Lafayette and its metropolitan area are predominantly religious, dominated by Christianity. According to the Association of Religion Data Archives in 2020, the Catholic Church was the single largest Christian denomination with a reported 212,013 adherents, and Protestants were the largest collective Christian group. Among Protestant Christians, the largest were non-denominational Christians with 26,860 adherents; Southern Baptists with 22,324; Progressive National Baptists with 19,324; United Methodists with 8,401; and Assemblies of God USA with 6,704 adherents.

Owing in part to Spanish and French colonialism and missionary work, Christians have historically affiliated with the Latin Church's Roman Catholic Diocese of Lafayette in Louisiana. The Roman Catholic Diocese of Lafayette in Louisiana was founded in 1918 and its see is the Cathedral of Saint John the Evangelist. Within the local Protestant traditions, Baptists have been the primary historic Protestant body affiliated with; the National Baptist Convention, USA, Inc. and Progressive National Baptist Convention have been the city and region's historically Black or African American Baptist denominations, though the Church of God in Christ has also been a historically prominent African American Protestant body.

Mormons, Lutherans, and Presbyterians have also maintained minority presences within the Lafayette municipal and metropolitan communities. Christians of other traditions including the Jehovah's Witnesses and united and uniting churches have been present in the city's metropolitan area since the 20th century. The Church of Jesus Christ of Latter-day Saints is the oldest nontrinitarian Christian denomination in Lafayette, and has one church in the city limits; the closest LDS churches outside of Lafayette are in New Iberia and Opelousas. There has been one Antiochian Orthodox jurisdiction operating since 2004; there is also a Coptic Orthodox mission under the Coptic Orthodox Diocese of the Southern United States. Altogether, the Eastern Orthodox Church, Oriental Orthodox Churches, and non-mainstream Protestantism have constituted a significant minority in contrast to Catholic and Baptist missionary work.

In a separate religious study by Sperling's BestPlaces in 2020, Judaism and Islam were tied as the second largest non-Christian religions within Lafayette and its metropolitan area. Jews began immigrating to the area in the 1800s, and one of Louisiana's oldest continuously operated synagogues (Temple Shalom) has been present in the city since 1869. The historic synagogue of Temple Shalom originally functioned as an Orthodox Jewish congregation before joining the Reform Judaism movement. Lafayette's Jewish community has assisted in economic and cultural development of the area since their arrival.

== Economy ==
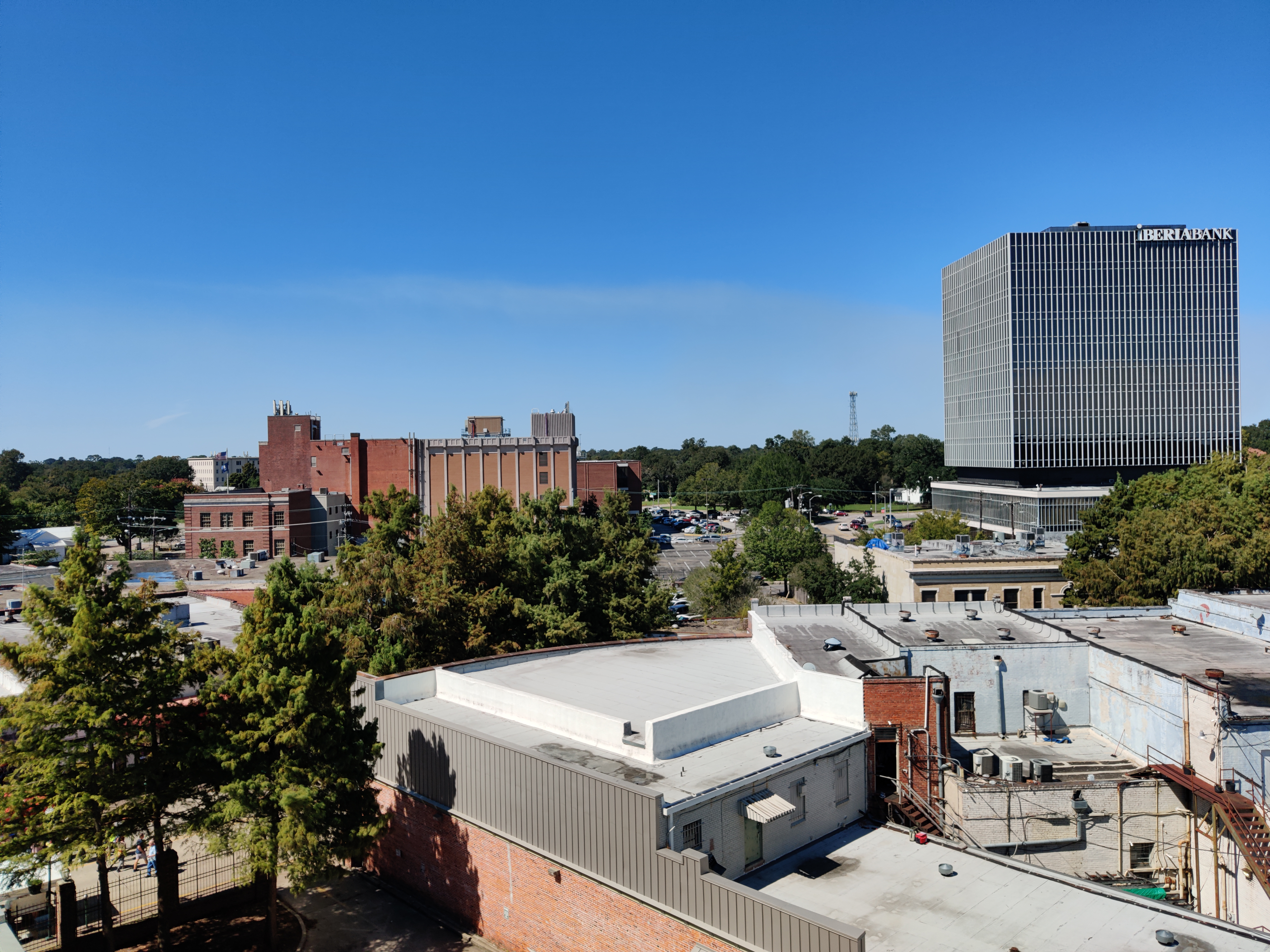
IberiaBank (now First Horizon Bank) tower, downtown Lafayette

Established and occupied as an agricultural community until the 1940s, Lafayette became a center of the oil and natural gas industry in Louisiana. In addition, the city and its metropolitan area became regional centers for technology, health care and social services, aerospace, banking and retail from the latter 20th- and early 21st centuries.

As of 2021, the consolidated city–parish's top employers have been the Lafayette Parish School System, Lafayette General Health, Wood Group Production Services, Lafayette Consolidated Government, the University of Louisiana at Lafayette, WHC, Inc., Walmart, Our Lady of Lourdes Regional Medical Center, Schlumberger, and Stuller, Inc. The University of Louisiana System's other institutions and its Lafayette campus have contributed to a $10.9 billion impact on the state's economy. As one of the primary employers in Lafayette, the local university has made a statewide impact of $379 million in 2015.

Prominent corporations with headquarters or a large presence in Lafayette have included or currently include Albertsons, Amazon, Brookshire Grocery Company, CGI, First Horizon Bank, JP Morgan Chase, LUSFiber, the Ochsner Health System, Petroleum Helicopters International, Perficient, and Rouses Markets. Among these corporations, the Tennessee-based First Horizon Bank absorbed IberiaBank (a former Louisiana-based banking institution) in 2020. Other notable corporations stimulating the city and metropolitan economies have been Lowe's, Costco, and various national retail and department stores in the Mall of Acadiana. By December 2023, Topgolf opened a venue in Lafayette.

Ranking as one of the best places to retire in Louisiana according to Forbes in 2018, Lafayette was also ranked one of the best places for businesses and careers in 2019; according to Forbes, it was #25 in the cost of doing business, #200 in job growth, and #175 in education nationwide. Per U.S. News & World Report, its cost of living has contributed to it being ranked as the second best place to live in Louisiana.

== Culture ==
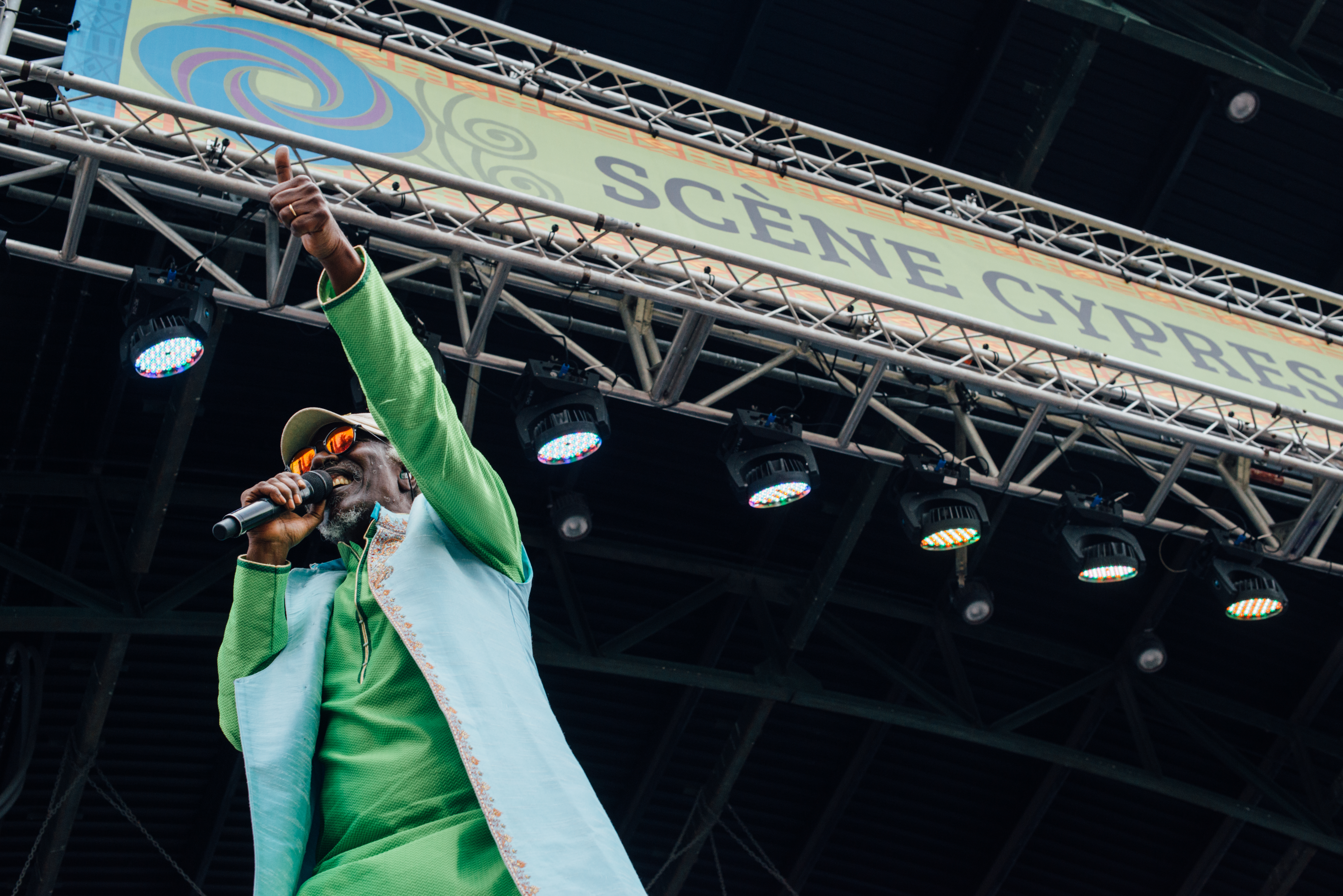
Alpha Blondy, from the Ivory Coast, performed in 2016 at the Festival International

The city of Lafayette lies at the center of the Louisiana cultural region known as Acadiana, home of the Acadian (Cajun) settlers who immigrated from eastern Canada. The Lafayette metropolitan area has a large Louisiana Creole, Cajun, and substantial foreign-born population; an estimated 14,676 Lafayettiens were foreign-born residents in 2019. Additionally, more than 36% of foreigners came from Asia from 2014 to 2019. This diversity of culture has undoubtedly contributed to Lafayette's unique blend of food, lifestyle and events. While these cultures have evolved overtime, the French influences deriving from the arrival of the Cajuns is still quite prevalent in everyday life.

Many annual events celebrate the diverse cultures of Lafayette. Highly regarded for its diverse food and restaurant culture, Lafayette has been regarded as having the fourth-most restaurants per capita in Louisiana since 2015. Further, Lafayette has consistently been named as one of the top culinary destinations in the south.

Although only a small percentage of Lafayette's population actively speak French, the language can be observed in everyday usage of local vernacular as well as business names or slogans and surnames of residents. Examples of Cajun and Creole influenced usage are "Bon Temp Grill", "Lagneaux's", "T-Coon's", "Cafe des amis" (now closed), "Prejean's", "Parish Brewery" and many more. When speaking English, many locals will use French inspired phrases, often unknowingly. For example, "I have the envies for barbecue tonight", which means "I'm craving barbecue tonight" leveraging the French word for craving/desire. Another example might be the use of "mais bruh," which is used to express surprise or astonishment, and is a combination of American slang and French.

Home to the Acadiana Symphony Orchestra and Conservatory of Music, Chorale Acadienne, Lafayette Ballet Theatre and Dance Conservatory, the Lafayette Concert Band, and Performing Arts Society of Acadiana; as well as the Paul and Lulu Hilliard University Art Museum, Acadiana Center for the Arts and Heymann Performing Arts Center; Lafayette has hosted Tyler Perry's Madea's Farewell play in 2019. The 2018 television film, The Christmas Contract, set in Lafayette, features many Cajun Christmas customs.

== Sports ==
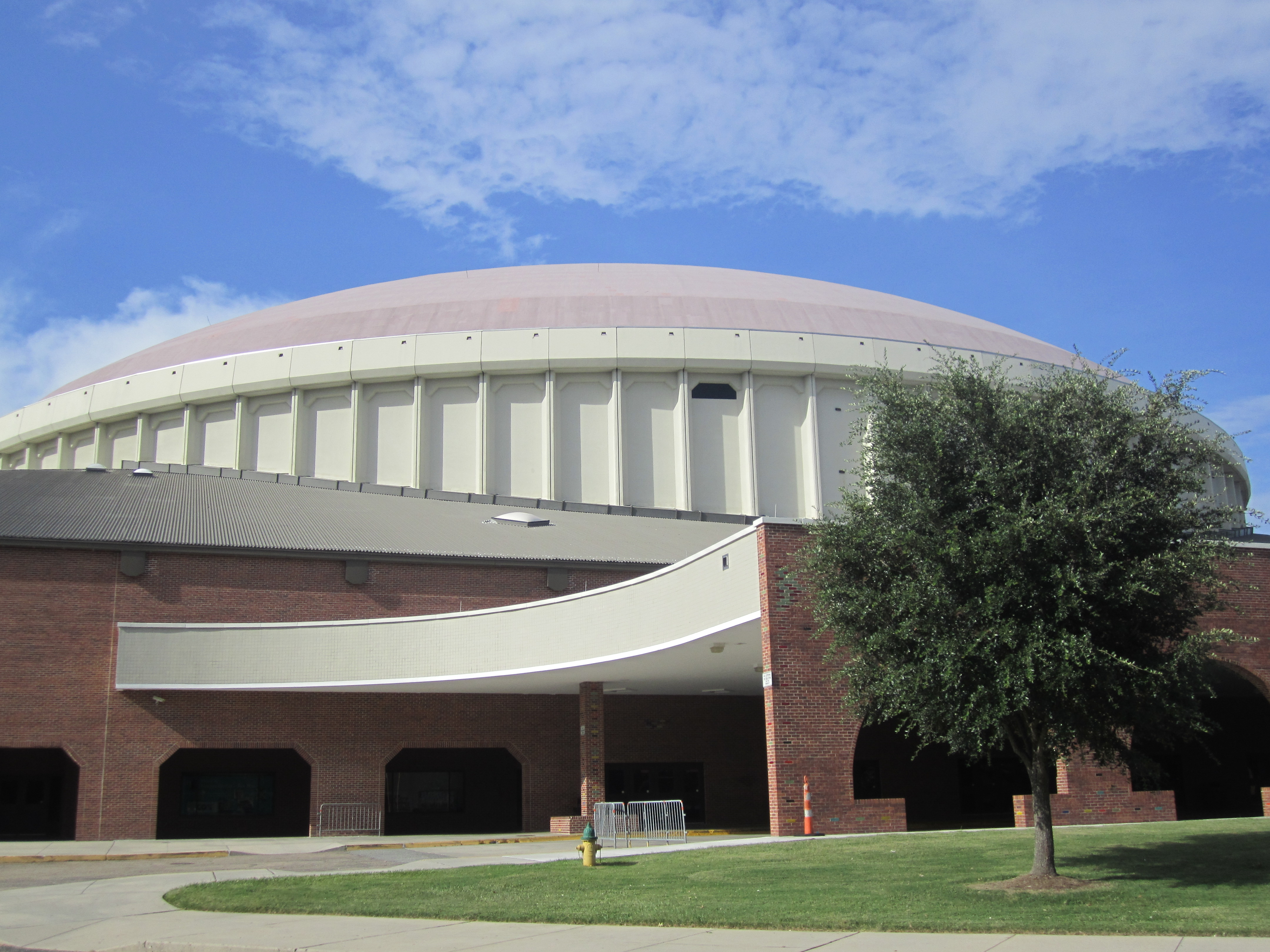
The Cajundome

Lafayette is home to the Louisiana Ragin' Cajuns, the athletic teams of the University of Louisiana at Lafayette. Between 1995 and 2005, Lafayette was home to the Louisiana IceGators ECHL hockey team. In 2009, the IceGators returned as a member of the Southern Professional Hockey League until 2016. Also from 2009 to 2012, Lafayette was home to the Lafayette Wildcatters of the Southern Indoor Football League. It also became home to the Lafayette Bayou Bulls, a semipro football program started in 2003. The Lafayette SwampCats (1997–1999) and Lafayette Swamp Cats (2000–2004) soccer teams played in the city. The Cajun Soccer Club of the Gulf Coast Premier League was founded in 2013; Louisiana Krewe FC played in the Gulf Coast Premier League before joining USL League Two for its 2022 season.

The Lafayette area is home to multiple sports venues: Blackham Coliseum, Cajundome, Our Lady of Lourdes Stadium, Earl K. Long Gymnasium, Evangeline Downs, and Planet Ice Skating and Hockey Arena.

Lafayette was home to minor-league baseball teams in various seasons from 1907 to 2000. Lafayette was an affiliate of the St. Louis Browns 1936–1941, Chicago Cubs (1955–1957) and San Francisco Giants (1975–1976). The Lafayette Browns (1907), Lafayette Hubs (1920), Lafayette White Sox (1934–1942), Lafayette Bulls (1948–1953), Lafayette Oilers (1954–1957), Lafayette Drillers (1975–1976) and Bayou Bullfrogs (1998–2000) all played in Lafayette. The teams were members of the Gulf Coast League (1907), Louisiana State League (1920), Evangeline League (1934–1942, 1948–1957), Texas League (1975–1976) and Texas-Louisiana League (1998–2000). Lafayette teams played at Parkdale Park (1934–1942), Clark Field (1945–1957, 1975–1976) and Tigue Moore Field (1998–2000).

== Government ==
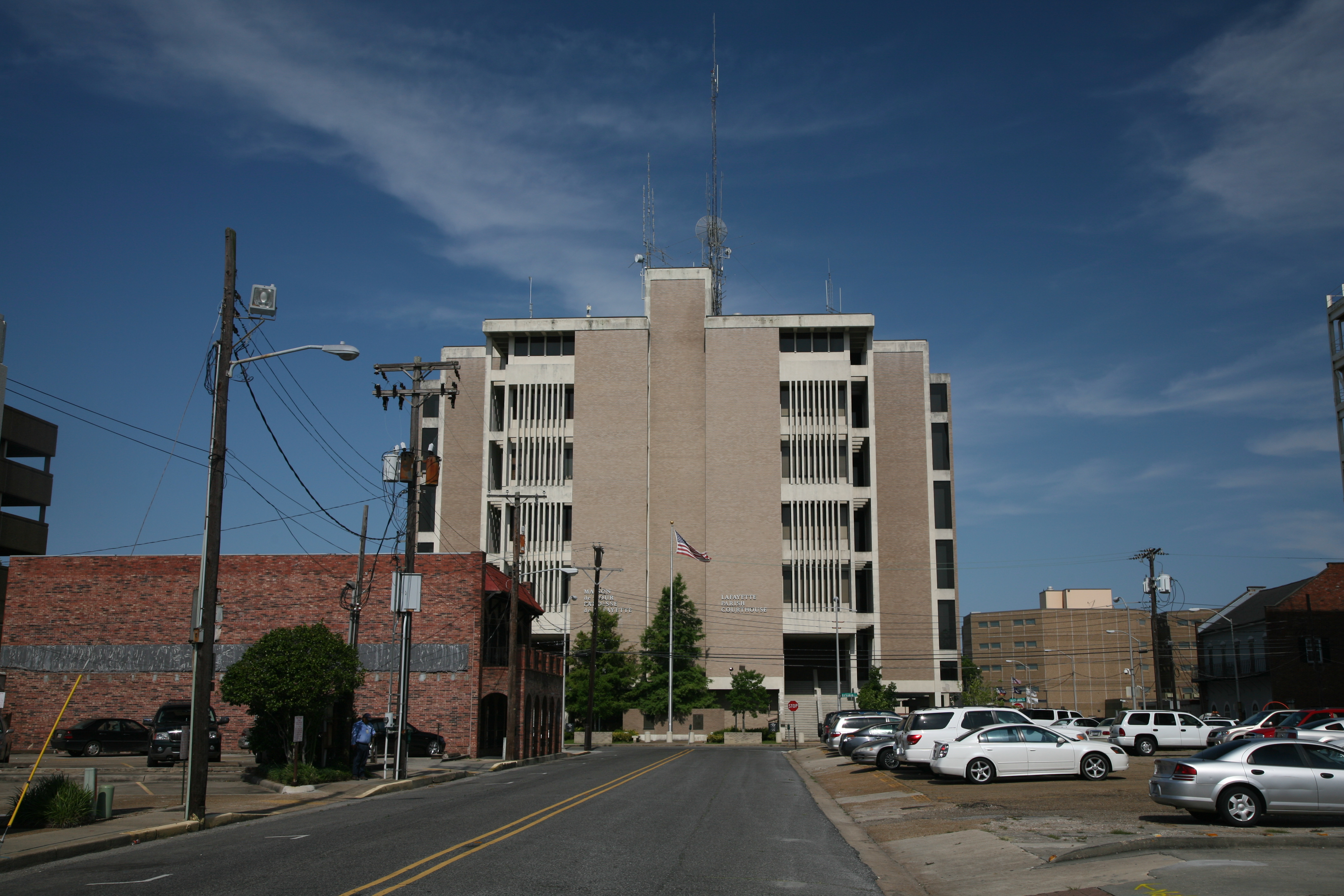
Lafayette Parish Courthouse

John M. Shaw U.S. Courthouse

Lafayette has a consolidated city–parish government, known as the Lafayette Consolidated Government; parish voters agreed to consolidation of the city and parish governments in 1996. Lafayette's chief executive was initially called the city-parish president, but is now known as the mayor-president for the Lafayette Consolidated Government. Republican Monique Blanco-Boulet was elected to this office most recently.

The consolidation of the city and parish has been the subject of continuous public debate over the years. In 2011, a charter commission recommended deconsolidation, though parish voters rejected the recommendation. In 2018, voters separated the single city–parish council into a city council to represent the city of Lafayette and a parish council to represent Lafayette Parish. The mayor-president is still elected parishwide. In 2021, the city council passed a resolution calling for another charter commission to look at amendments to the charter and, if necessary, deconsolidation. The Lafayette Parish Council did not agree to the charter commission proposal. Public works and other services, such as land use and plat review, are operated by the Lafayette Consolidated Government to serve the city of Lafayette and unincorporated areas of Lafayette Parish, and by contract some of the area municipalities. Zoning rules apply only within the city and unincorporated areas of Lafayette Parish.

Some neighboring municipalities have adopted their own planning and zoning protocols. The suburban and rural cities and towns maintain independent city councils, local executives, police and fire departments, and other public services. The LPSS operates independently of any municipality, and its jurisdiction is coterminous with Lafayette Parish.

Lafayette is home to a regional office of the Louisiana Department of Environmental Quality, and the headquarters of the Council for the Development of French in Louisiana, the state agency that oversees preservation and documentation of Louisiana French for tourism, economic development, culture, education, and the development of international relations with other Francophone regions and countries.

=== Public safety ===
The city of Lafayette is primarily served by the Lafayette Police Department, though the Lafayette Parish Sheriff's Office, Lafayette City Marshal, and University of Louisiana Police Department maintain jurisdiction throughout the city and surrounding area. Following nationwide COVID-19 trends from 2019 to 2020, Lafayette has experienced a rise in violent crimes per the Federal Bureau of Investigation. In 2020, the city experienced 712 violent crimes up from 664 in 2019; according to a professor of the University of Louisiana at Lafayette, violent crime was decreasing prior to the pandemic. In 2018 the city experienced 9 homicides, and 17 in 2020; for comparison, there were 195 homicides in New Orleans in 2020, and 100 in Baton Rouge. Altogether, Lafayette ranked as the 20th safest city overall in Louisiana, and the safest of Louisiana's four largest municipalities in 2021.

== Media ==
Lafayette's major daily newspaper is The Daily Advertiser, owned by Gannett (publishers of USA Today). Established in 1865 as the Weekly Advertiser, it purchased the local alternative paper, The Times of Acadiana in 1998. Other prominent newspapers in the Lafayette area include Acadiana Profile, Baton Rouge-based The Advocate and its local paper The Acadiana Advocate, The Independent, and UL-based The Vermilion. The Current is a non-profit online news organization that has published since 2017.

Licensing more than 22 FM and AM radio stations in its metropolitan area, Lafayette includes Valcour Records and ML1 Records in its metropolis. Major television stations include KATC 3 (ABC), KLFY-TV (CBS, with the CW Plus on DT2), KLAF-LD (NBC), KADN-TV (Fox), and KLPB-TV (PBS). Other major stations serving the Lafayette area include Alexandria's KALB-TV (NBC, with CBS on DT2), Baton Rouge's WBRZ (ABC), WAFB (CBS), WGMB-TV (Fox, with The CW on DT2), WVLA-TV (NBC), and Lake Charles' KPLC-TV (NBC, with the CW Plus on DT2). According to Nielsen Media Research, the Lafayette television market was the 123rd largest in the United States as of 2019.

== Education ==
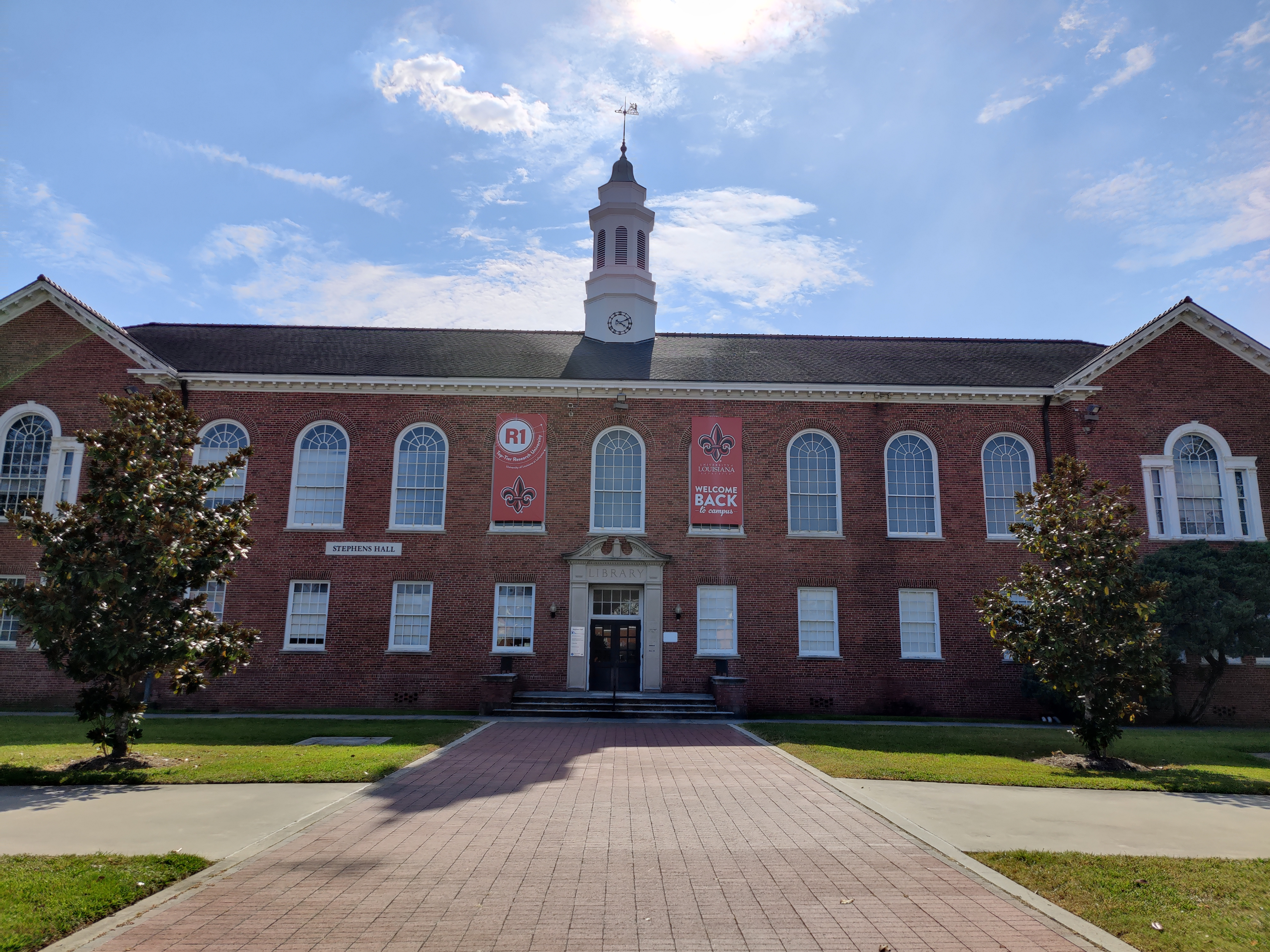
Stephens Hall at the University of Louisiana at Lafayette, one of the edifices encircling the UL Quad

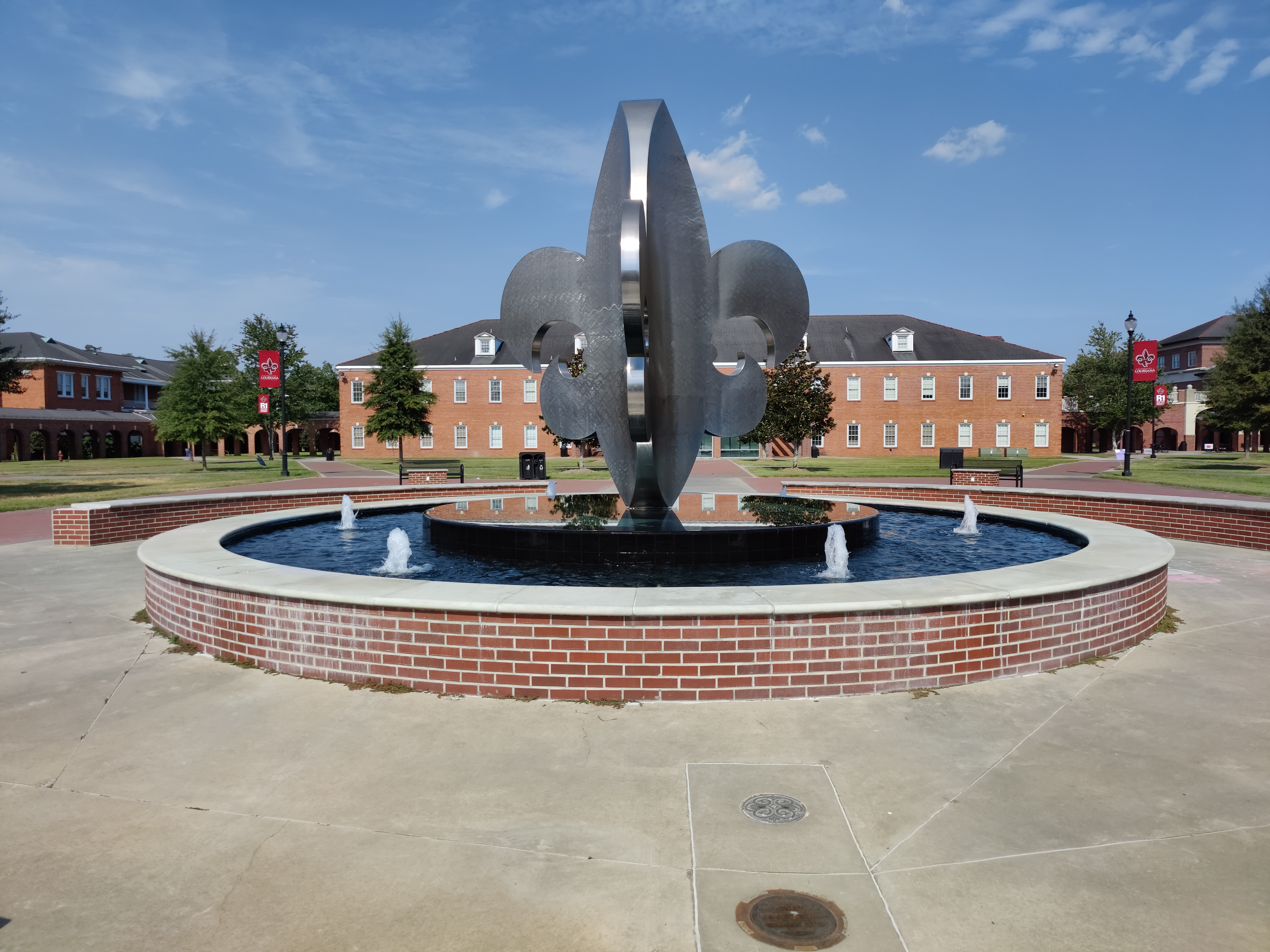
Fleur-de-lis fountain at UL Quad

=== Primary and secondary education ===
Lafayette Parish School System is the largest primary and secondary education system for Lafayette and its metropolitan area. Covering the whole of Lafayette Parish, it has 45 schools: 25 elementary schools, 12 middle schools, and eight high schools. The Lafayette Parish School System offers nine career academies at the high-school level, school curricula designed to prepare students in certain career fields. Of note among the schools in this system are Lafayette High School and Acadiana High School, its two largest high schools by enrollment.

A majority of the area's private parochial, K-12 schools are operated by the Roman Catholic Diocese of Lafayette in Louisiana.

=== Collegiate and university education ===
Its university, the University of Louisiana at Lafayette, is the flagship university for the University of Louisiana System; as a national research institution and home to more than 18,000 students, over 100 programs, and the Louisiana Ragin' Cajuns, it is the second-largest university in the state behind Louisiana State University in Baton Rouge. Attempting unsuccessfully to change its name to the "University of Louisiana" previously, the university's moniker as "Louisiana" became points of contention, and the community colloquially refers to the institution as the University of Louisiana, dropping "Lafayette" from the name.

One of the newest college systems in Louisiana, South Louisiana Community College, is headquartered in Lafayette. South Louisiana Community College partnered with Acadian Ambulance to form the National EMS Academy, which offers EMT-Basic and EMT-Paramedic certification. This community college is part of the Louisiana Community and Technical College System. Louisiana Technical College (Lafayette campus) is part of the Louisiana Technical College System, which in turn is part of the Louisiana Community and Technical College System. It offers associate degrees in several fields. It is a vocational school that offers a few bachelor's-degree programs, many associate-degree programs, and a few diploma programs. Additionally, Lafayette is also home to the Lafayette campus of the Academy of Interactive Entertainment, a technical college that specializes in video game programming, art and animation, and SFX.

== Military ==
Lafayette is home to the Louisiana Army National Guard headquarters of the 256th Infantry Brigade, a military unit of more than 3,000 soldiers. The unit served in Iraq in 2004–2005. The brigade was deployed again in January 2010. Until 2014, Lafayette was also home to the United States Marine Corps Reserve Unit, F. Co. Anti-Terrorism Battalion commanded by Captain Cole Clements. This unit went on several deployments, many related to the Iraq War. In 2014, F. Co. Anti-Terrorism Battalion was decommissioned, to be replaced with H&S Co. Det. 4 4th Tanks Tow and Scouts, 4th MARDIV.

== Transportation ==
Lafayette Regional Airport—located on U.S. Highway 90 (future Interstate 49), on the southeast side of the city with daily scheduled passenger airline services nonstop to Atlanta, Dallas/Fort Worth, Houston and effective April 2, 2021 to Charlotte—is the primary airport for Acadiana. Charter services also depart Lafayette Regional as well as helicopter flights and cargo jets. A new airline passenger terminal at the Lafayette airport opened on January 20, 2022.

Alongside its aerial transportation methods, Interstate 10 and Interstate 49 are the primary highways, with a passenger rail. The Amtrak Sunset Limited offers service three days a week from New Orleans and Los Angeles, California with selected stops in Louisiana, Texas, New Mexico, Arizona and California. Connections are available in New Orleans to Chicago and to the East Coast via Atlanta. Service eastward to Orlando, Florida remains suspended in the aftermath of Hurricane Katrina. Greyhound also operates a station downtown on Lee Avenue with destinations east and west on I-10, north on I-49 and southeast on U.S. Hwy 90. The Lafayette Transit System (formerly City of Lafayette Transit (COLT)) provides bus service.

There are certain areas within the city of Lafayette dedicated to growing into a bicycle-friendly community. The Lafayette MPO Bicycle Subcommittee meet once a month and has developed long-term goals for bicycling in the area. BikeLafayette is the area's bicycle advocacy organization which is very active in promoting bicycle awareness, safety, and education in Acadiana. TRAIL is an organization that promotes bicycling, canoeing, and pedestrian activities. The University of Louisiana at Lafayette has installed an off-road paved bicycle path beginning at its Horticultural Center on Johnston Street extending up Cajundome Boulevard to Eraste Landry Road. A number of out of use bicycle/pedestrian sidewalk paths remain from the 1970s and 1980s but are unsigned. A recreational trail extending from Downtown Lafayette into the Cypress Island region of Saint Martin Parish is under development. This path will connect neighboring Breaux Bridge and Saint Martinville with Lafayette.

U.S. Route 90 (co-signed with Evangeline Thruway, Mudd Avenue and Cameron Street within the city limits) and U.S. Route 167 (co-signed with I-49, Evangeline Thruway and Johnston Street). Ambassador Caffery Parkway, named for Jefferson Caffery, serves as a partial loop connecting I-10 at Exit 100 on the west and U.S. 90 on the south. Other arterial roads include Verot School Road (LA 339), West Congress Street, Kaliste Saloom Road (LA 3095), Ridge Road, Carmel Drive/Breaux Bridge Highway (LA 94), University Avenue (LA 182), Pinhook Road (LA 182), Camellia Boulevard, Guilbeau Road, Moss Street, Willow Street, Louisiana Avenue, Pont Des Mouton Road, Eraste Landry Road, and South College Road.

== Sister cities ==
Lafayette has seven sister cities:

- Le Cannet, Alpes-Maritimes, Provence-Alpes-Côte d'Azur, France (twinned May 26, 1967)
- Longueuil, Quebec, Canada (twinned December 3, 1968)
- Moncton, New Brunswick, Canada (twinned October 19, 1971)
- Poitiers, Vienne, Nouvelle-Aquitaine, France (twinned April 22, 1975)
- Namur, Namur Province, Belgium (twinned June 19, 1979)
- Agnibilékrou, Ivory Coast (twinned October 5, 1999)
- Centla, Mexico (twinned November 4, 2013)

== Notable people ==
- Autumn, rapper and record producer
- Marc Broussard, singer-songwriter
- Buckwheat Zydeco, zydeco musician
- Jefferson Caffery, American diplomat
- Christian Keener Cagle, American Football Player / NFL and College Player of the year
- Jermell Charlo, boxer
- Daniel Cormier, former professional mixed martial artist and Olympic wrestler
- Armand Duplantis, Olympic pole vaulter representing Sweden
- Amy Guidry, surrealist painter
- Ron Guidry, Cy Young-winning pitcher for the New York Yankees
- Leigh Hennessy, world champion gymnast and movie/TV stuntwoman
- Angela Kinsey, actress
- Victor Marx, author, minister, and candidate for governor of Colorado
- Alex McCool, manager of NASA Space Shuttle Projects Office
- Louis J. Michot, politician
- RJ Mitte, actor who played Walt Jr. on Breaking Bad
- Fred Prejean, community organizer and activist
- Dustin Poirier, former professional mixed martial artist
- Addison Rae, social media personality, singer, dancer, and actress
- Eddy Raven, American singer-songwriter
- George Rodrigue, artist known for The Blue Dog
- Richard Simmons, exercise guru
- Summrs, American rapper and singer

== See also ==
- Youngsville, Louisiana
