= Holy Rosary Institute =

- U.S. National Register of Historic Places
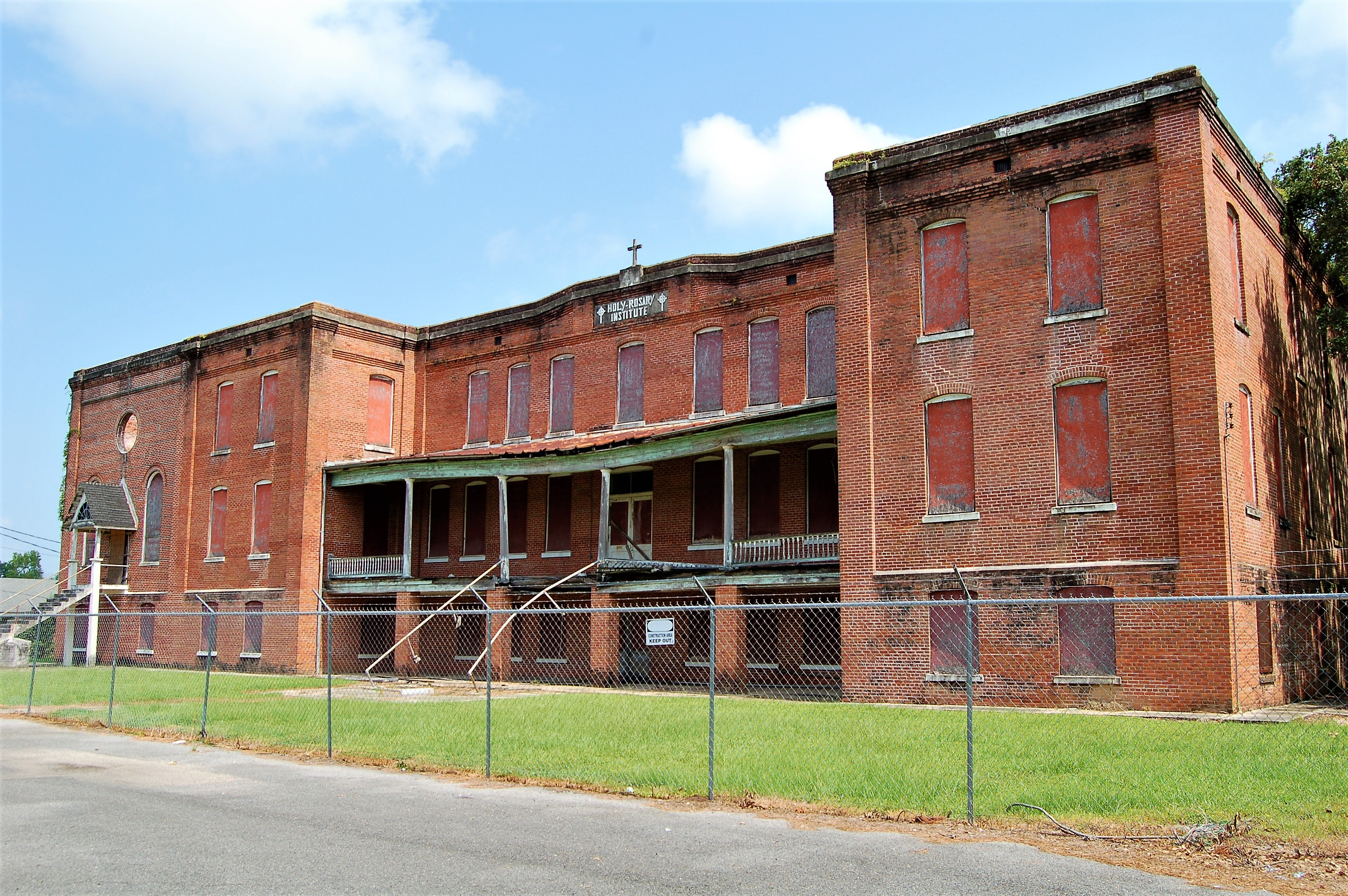

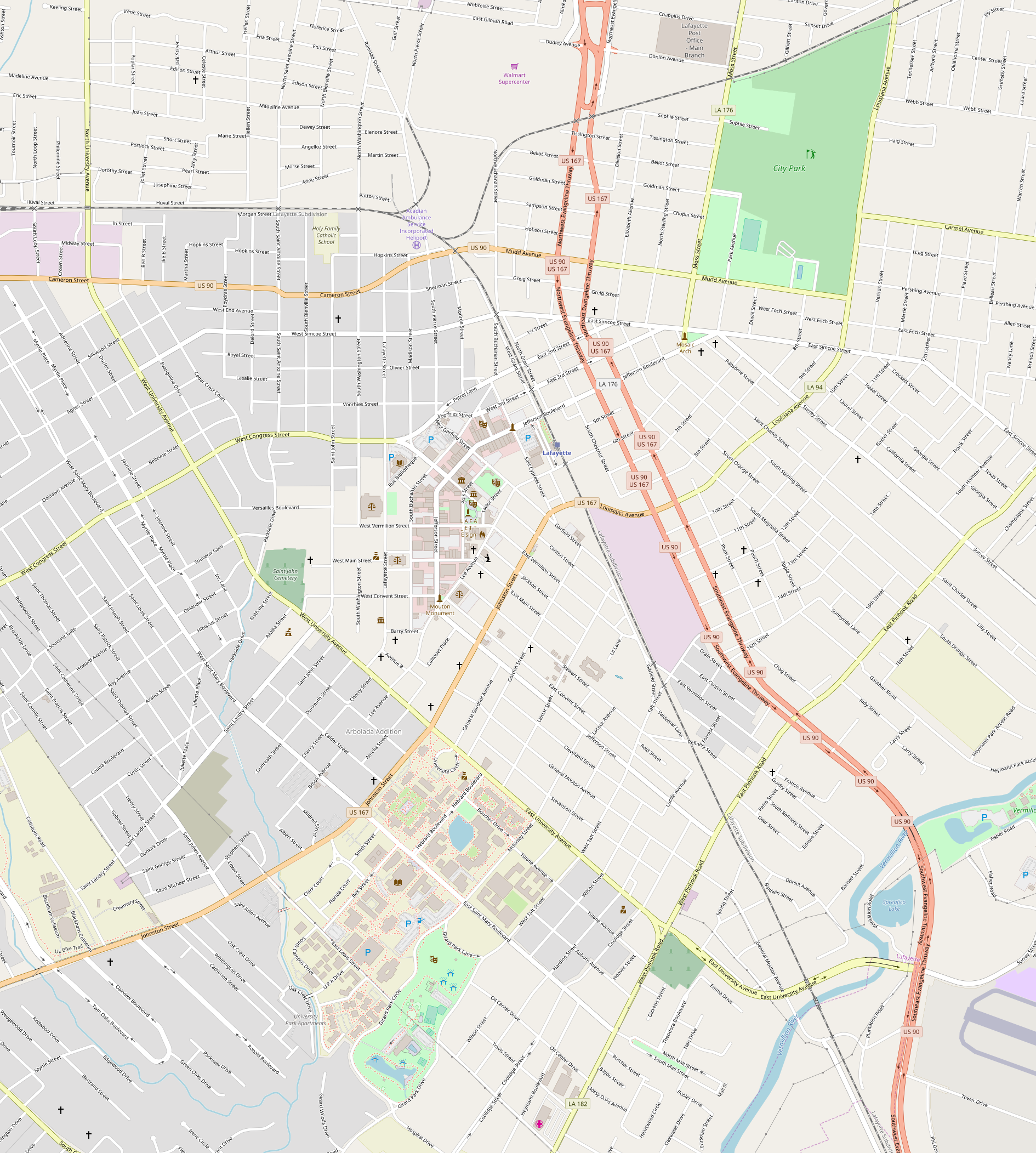
- Location within Lafayette
- Location: 421 Carmel St. Lafayette, Louisiana
- Coordinates: 30°14′07″N 91°59′52″W
- Area: 1 acre (0.40 ha)
- Built: 1913
- Built by: Reverend Philip Keller
- Architectural style: Greek Revival
- NRHP reference No.: 80001734
- Added to NRHP: December 3, 1980

The Holy Rosary Institute is a historic school building located at 421 Carmel Drive in Lafayette, Louisiana, United States. It is one of the few remaining historic Black Catholic high school buildings in the United States.

== History ==
The original Greek Revival building, now surrounded by other modern school buildings, was founded in 1913 by Reverend Philip Keller and the Sisters of the Holy Family.

The institute was initially built in order to provide vocational and technical education for black females. It also served as a Normal School to train teachers for rural black schools. In 1947, it became a co-ed facility. Enrollment began to decline in the 1960s and in 1974, the boarding facilities were closed.

The building was listed on the National Register of Historic Places on December 3, 1980.

The school was closed in 1993.

== Holy Rosary Redevelopment ==
In 2020 the Holy Rosary Redevelopment Corporation broke ground to restore a historic part of the city's black community. With $4.5 million in state funding and 450.000 from the National Park Service they embarked on a three- phase project to revitalize the former Holy Rosary Institute.

The Northeast Regional Library will officially be named for civil rights leader and longtime Xavier University President Norman C. Francis. The library is a key component of the broader Holy Rosary Redevelopment Initiative which will expand services in technology, education, community, and library services in North Lafayette. The library is expected to open in 2028 near Holy Rosary Institute.

== See Also ==
- National Register of Historic Places listings in Lafayette Parish, Louisiana
