= The Independent (Acadiana) =

The IND Monthly
- Type: Monthly newspaper
- Founded: 2003
- Ceased publication: 2017
- Language: English
- Headquarters: Lafayette, Louisiana
- Website: www.theind.com

The IND Monthly (formerly The Independent Weekly) was a newspaper published in Lafayette, Louisiana. It was launched in 2003.

It printed its final issue in March 2017 and shut down permanently in June 2017.
