= List of museums in Louisiana =

This list of museums in Louisiana is a list of museums, defined for this context as institutions (including nonprofit organizations, government entities, and private businesses) that collect and care for objects of cultural, artistic, scientific, or historical interest and make their collections or related exhibits available for public viewing. Museums that exist only in cyberspace (i.e., virtual museums) are not included. Also included are non-profit and university art galleries.

== Museums ==
Name	Town/City	Parish	Region	Type	Summary
Finding Our Roots African American Museum	Houma	Terrebonne	Baton Rouge area	Local History	website, Local African American History and Culture from slavery to civil right era, formerly in building that was destroyed in Hurricane Ida, now run as a mobile museum
Abbeville Museum	Abbeville	Vermilion	Cajun Heartland	Multiple	website, Local art, history and Acadian culture, operated by the Abbeville Cultural and Historical Alliance
Abita Mystery House	Abita Springs	St. Tammany	Baton Rouge area	Art	Folk art and artistic displays of unusual collections, also known as the UCM Museum
Acadian Cultural Center	Lafayette	Lafayette	Cajun Heartland	Culture	Exhibits about the origins, migration, settlement, and contemporary culture of the Acadians and other local peoples, part of Jean Lafitte National Historical Park and Preserve
Acadian Museum	Erath	Vermilion	Cajun Heartland	Local history	website, Acadian heritage and Cajun people of Louisiana
Acadian Village	Lafayette	Lafayette	Cajun Heartland	Open air	Includes an art gallery, doctor's museum, blacksmith shop and several Acadian houses
Acadiana Center for the Arts	Lafayette	Lafayette	Cajun Heartland	Art	website
Adai Indian Nation Culture Center	Robeline	Natchitoches	Northwest	Native American	
Adam Ponthieu Grocery Store & Big Bend Post Office Museum	Moreauville	Avoyelles	Central	History	
Addis Museum	Addis	West Baton Rouge	Baton Rouge area	Local history	Formerly the Bank of Addis
Alexandre Mouton House	Lafayette	Lafayette	Cajun Heartland	Historic house	19th-century home of 9th governor and first Democratic governor of Louisiana Alexandre Mouton
Alexandria Museum of Art	Alexandria	Rapides	Central	Art	Collections include contemporary Louisiana art and Northern Louisiana folk art
Alexandria T.R.E.E. House Children's Museum	Alexandria	Rapides	Central	Children's	
Andonie Museum	Baton Rouge	East Baton Rouge	Baton Rouge area	Sports	website, history of sports at Louisiana State University
Angola Museum	Angola	West Feliciana	Baton Rouge area	Prison	website. History of the Louisiana State Penitentiary
Ark-La-Tex Sports Museum of Champions	Shreveport	Caddo	Northwest	Sports	Located in the foyer of the Shreveport Convention Center
Audubon State Historic Site	St. Francisville	West Feliciana	Baton Rouge area	Historic house	Features the late Federal Period (1790–1830) Oakley Plantation, where artist John James Audubon stayed in 1821
Autrey House Museum	Dubach	Lincoln	Northwest	Historic house	1849 dogtrot log house, owned by the Lincoln Parish Museum
Baker Heritage Museum	Baker	East Baton Rouge	Baton Rouge area	History	website, operated by the City
Barataria Museum	Jean Lafitte	Jefferson	Greater New Orleans	Local history	website, local history, life of pirate Jean Lafitte, culture of area wetland dwellers, coastal environment including erosion, natural and man-made disasters
Barksdale Global Power Museum	Bossier City	Bossier	Northwest	Aerospace	website, located on Barksdale Air Force Base, features military aircraft and historical artifacts, formerly the Eighth Air Force Museum
Baton Rouge Gallery	Baton Rouge	East Baton Rouge	Baton Rouge area	Art	website, contemporary art
Bayou Lacombe Museum	Lacombe	St. Tammany	Baton Rouge area	Local history	Opened in a historic two-room schoolhouse
Bayou Teche Museum	New Iberia	Iberia	Southwest	Local history	website, displays about area history, culture, food and music
Bayou Terrebonne Waterlife Museum	Houma	Terrebonne	Baton Rouge area	Local history	website, industries, traditions and personal stories
Beauregard Parish Museum	DeRidder	Beauregard	Southwest	Local history	Located in a former railroad depot, includes the Lois Loftin Doll Museum with over 3000 dolls
Bernice Depot Museum	Bernice	Union	Northwest	Railroad	website
Biedenharn Museum and Gardens	Monroe	Ouachita	Northeast	Multiple	Includes the Biedenharn mansion, Coca-Cola Museum, Bible Museum and gardens
Bienville Depot Museum	Arcadia	Bienville	Central	Local history	Local history and art exhibits
Bishop Martin Museum	Natchitoches	Natchitoches	Central	Religious	Historic artifacts from the early days of the Diocese of Alexandria, adjacent to the Minor Basilica of the Immaculate Conception
Black Bayou Lake National Wildlife Refuge	Monroe	Ouachita	Northeast	Natural history	Visitor center exhibits about the wildlife and ecosystems of the refuge, also live animals
Bonnie & Clyde Ambush Museum	Gibsland	Bienville	Northwest	Biographical	website, history of gangsters Bonnie & Clyde
Bossier Parish Library Historical Center	Bossier City	Bossier	Northwest	Local history	website, adjacent to the Bossier Central Library
Brimstone Museum	Sulphur	Calcasieu	Southwest	Local history	website, housed in a depot, also changing art exhibits
Butler Greenwood Plantation	St. Francisville	West Feliciana	Baton Rouge area	Historical house	
Cajun Music Hall of Fame	Eunice	Acadia	Cajun Heartland	Music	website, includes Cajun musical instruments, records and albums of Cajun sounds, hall of fame, operated by the Cajun French Music Association
Cameron Prairie National Wildlife Refuge	Cameron	Cameron	Southwest	Natural history	Visitor center features exhibits on the birds, wildlife and ecosystems found in the refuge
Camp Moore Confederate Cemetery and Museum	Tangipahoa	Tangipahoa	Baton Rouge area	Military	American Civil War Confederate training base and principal base of operations in eastern Louisiana and southwestern Mississippi
Canary Islanders Cultural Museum	Houma	Terrebonne	Baton Rouge area	Historic house	
Capt. Fletcher E. Adams 357th Fighter Group Museum	Ida	Caddo	Northwest	Military	website, history and memorabilia of the 357th Fighter Group
Capitol Park Museum	Baton Rouge	East Baton Rouge	Baton Rouge area	Multiple	Exhibits on Louisiana history, industry and culture, branch of the Louisiana State Museum
CARTE Museum	Baton Rouge	East Baton Rouge	Baton Rouge area	Local history	Dedicated to the preservation of original maps and atlases
Cathedral of St. John the Evangelist	Lafayette	Lafayette	Cajun Heartland	Religious	Includes the Cathedral Museum with exhibits about the history of the cathedral and the parish
Centenary State Historic Site	Jackson	East Feliciana	Baton Rouge area	Education	Restored buildings of the former Centenary College, exhibits about early education in Louisiana, Civil War medicine, and local history
Central School Arts & Humanities Center	Lake Charles	Calcasieu	Southwest	Art	Houses arts organizations including the Arts Council of SWLA, several non-profit gallery spaces and the Mardi Gras Museum of Imperial Calcasieu
Charenton Heritage Museum	Charenton	St. Mary	Cajun Heartland	Local history	
Chennault Aviation and Military Museum	Monroe	Ouachita	Northeast	Aerospace	website, located at Monroe Regional Airport (Louisiana), history of World War II Selman Army Airfield, General Claire Lee Chennault, historic aircraft and memorabilia
The Children's Museum	Lake Charles	Calcasieu	Southwest	Children's	
Children's Museum of Acadiana	Lafayette	Lafayette	Cajun Heartland	Children's	website
Chitimacha Museum	Charenton	St. Mary	Cajun Heartland	Native American	website, heritage and culture of the Chitimacha
Collinswood Museum	Ponchatoula	Tangipahoa	Baton Rouge area	Local history	website
Cottonport Museum	Cottonport	Avoyelles	Cajun Heartland	Local history	Includes exhibits on area cotton farming
Covington Trailhead Museum	Covington	St. Tammany	Baton Rouge area	Local history	
Creole Heritage Folklife Center	Opelousas	St. Landry	Cajun Heartland	African American	
Crystal Rice Plantation	Crowley	Acadia	Cajun Heartland	Multiple	website, working rice farm tour, includes Blue Rose Museum, a Creole cottage with decorative collectibles, and Salmon's Classic Car Garage with vintage automobiles
DeFosse Home	Mansura	Avoyelles	Central	Historic house	French Colonial style home, open by appointment
Delta Music Museum	Ferriday	Concordia	Central	Music	Local musicians
Destrehan Plantation	Destrehan	St. Charles	Greater New Orleans	Historic house	Antebellum plantation home with costumed interpreters depicting historic crafts and life
DeQuincy Railroad Museum	DeQuincy	Calcasieu	Southwest	Railroad	website, railroad-related artifacts from the Kansas City Southern, Missouri Pacific, and Union Pacific Railroads
DeQuincy Town Hall Museum	DeQuincy	Calcasieu	Southwest	Local history	
Dorcheat Historical Association Museum	Minden	Webster	Northwest	Local history	19th and 20th century local history and culture
Eddie G. Robinson Museum	Grambling	Lincoln	Northwest	Biographical	website, Grambling State University football coach Eddie G. Robinson
E. D. White Historic Site	Thibodaux	Lafourche	Greater New Orleans	Historic house	Operated by the Louisiana State Museum, 19th century residence of two major Louisiana politicians
Enchanted Mansion	Baton Rouge	East Baton Rouge	Baton Rouge area	Toy	website, antique and collectible modern dolls, open by appointment
Eunice Depot Museum	Eunice	Acadia	Cajun Heartland	Local history	Located in an old depot
Evergreen Plantation	Wallace	St. John the Baptist	Baton Rouge area	Historic house	Mid 19th century plantation including 22 slave quarters, open by appointment
Fairview-Riverside State Park	Madisonville	St. Tammany	Baton Rouge area	Historic house	Includes Otis House Museum
Fort Jackson, Louisiana	Port Sulphur	Plaquemines	Baton Rouge area	Military	Early 19th century fort that was a battle site in the American Civil War.
Fort Jesup State Historic Site	Many	Sabine	Central	Military	Fort used to protect the United States border with Spain in the early 19th century
Fort St. Jean Baptiste State Historic Site	Natchitoches	Natchitoches	Central	Military	Restored 18th century military outpost and commercial trade center
Frogmore Plantation	Ferriday	Concordia	Central	Open air	website, 1,800-acre (7.3 km^{2}) working cotton plantation with restored antebellum farm buildings
German-American Cultural Center and Museum	Gretna	Jefferson	Greater New Orleans	Ethnic	website, German immigrant contributions to Louisiana's history and culture
Germantown Colony and Museum	Minden	Webster	Northwest	History	19th century Harmony Society site
GOSH Museum	Slidell	St. Tammany	Greater New Orleans	Local history	Located in the restored Our Lady of Lourdes convent
Grandmother's Buttons	St. Francisville	West Feliciana	Baton Rouge area	Commodity	website, store and museum with antique buttons and fasteners
Greenwood Plantation (Louisiana)	St. Francisville	West Feliciana	Baton Rouge area	Historic house	website
Gretna Historical Society Museum	Gretna	Jefferson	Greater New Orleans	Open air	website, complex includes local history exhibits, 19th century period Creole cottage, Louisiana State Fire Museum in a historic firehouse, blacksmith shop, caboose museum
Grevemberg House Museum	Franklin	St. Mary	Cajun Heartland	Historic house	website, mid-19th century period antebellum townhouse
Gueydan Museum	Gueydan	Vermilion	Cajun Heartland	Local history	website
H J Smith's Son General Store and Museum	Covington	St. Tammany	Baton Rouge area	History	Historic general store and museum of local historic artifacts and oddities
Herbert S. Ford Memorial Museum	Homer	Claiborne	Northwest	Local history	
Hermione Museum	Tallulah	Madison	Northwest	Local history	information, operated by the Madison Historical Society, includes exhibit on Madam C. J. Walker
Historic City Hall Arts & Cultural Center	Lake Charles	Calcasieu	Southwest	Art	website, city's public art gallery
Houmas House Plantation and Gardens	Darrow	Ascension	Baton Rouge area	Historic house	Mid 19th century plantation house and buildings
Iberville Museum	Plaquemine	Iberville	Baton Rouge area	Local history	website,
ICONS Museum	Covington	St. Tammany	North Shore area	Art & entertainment	Private museum, appointment only, displaying the work of the artist Matthew Montero; Website
Imperial Calcasieu Museum	Lake Charles	Calcasieu	Southwest	Multiple	website, local art and history
Independence Italian Cultural Museum	Independence	Tangipahoa	Baton Rouge area	Ethnic	Open by appointment, area Italian culture and heritage
International Petroleum Museum and Exposition	Morgan City	St. Mary	Cajun Heartland	Industry	website, also known as the Rig Museum, offshore oil and gas industry, oil rig tours
Isaiah Garrett Law Office	Monroe	Ouachita	Northeast	Historic site	website, 1840s period law office, operated by The National Society of the Colonial Dames of America
J. Bennett Johnston Waterway Regional Visitor Center	Shreveport	Caddo	Northwest	Maritime	website, history along the Red River and the works of the U.S. Army Corps of Engineers
Jackson Parish Heritage Museum	Jonesboro	Jackson	Northeast	Local history	website, operated by the Jackson Parish Museum & Fine Arts Association
Jean Lafitte National Historical Park and Preserve	Chalmette	St. Bernard	Greater New Orleans	Military	Chalmette Battlefield visitor center, exhibits about the Battle of New Orleans
Jean Lafitte National Historical Park and Preserve	Marrero	Jefferson		Natural history	Barataria Preserve includes trails, visitor center displays about the ecology of the wetlands, the national importance of the area, and the relation between the land and its people
Jean Lafitte National Historical Park and Preserve	Thibodaux	Lafourche	Greater New Orleans	Culture	Wetlands Acadian Cultural Center
Jeanerette Museum	Jeanerette	Iberia	Southwest	Local history	website
Karpeles Manuscript Library Museum	Shreveport	Caddo	Northwest	Multiple	Features changing exhibits of history, art and culture from its collections
Kent Plantation House	Alexandria	Rapides	Central	Historic house	Features French, Spanish and American cultural influences
Kentwood Museum	Kentwood	Tangipahoa	Baton Rouge area	Local history	website, features display about singerBritney Spears
Krewe of Gemini Mardi Gras Museum	Bossier City	Bossier	Northwest	Amusement	website, history of Mardi Gras in Louisiana, costumes and floats
Lafayette Arts Association Gallery	Lafayette	Lafayette	Cajun Heartland	Art	website
Lafayette Science Museum	Lafayette	Lafayette	Cajun Heartland	Science	website, exhibits on space, geology, meteorites, planetarium, formerly the Lafayette Natural History Museum and Planetarium
Lake Pontchartrain Basin Maritime Museum	Madisonville	St. Tammany	Baton Rouge area	Maritime	website, maritime history of Lake Pontchartrain Basin, the lower Mississippi River Valley, and the Gulf Coast of Louisiana, including boats, canals, lighthouses and Civil War history
Laura Plantation	Vacherie	St. James	Baton Rouge area	Historic house	19th century Créole-style big house and outbuildings, including six slave quarters
Laurel Valley Village Museum and Country Store	Thibodaux	Lafourche	Greater New Orleans	Open air	Historic village and plantation within a modern sugar cane farm, general store with agriculture tools and displays
Leatherwood Museum	Oakdale	Allen	Southwest	Local history	Local history, culture, agriculture and timber industries
Le Vieux Village	Opelousas	St. Landry	Cajun Heartland	Open air	website, includes historic rural life buildings, Jim Bowie Museum, Louisiana Orphan Train Museum
Le Musee' De Kaplan	Kaplan	Vermilion	Cajun Heartland	Local history	
Lincoln Parish Museum	Ruston	Lincoln	Northeast	Historic house	website, also known as the Kidd-Davis House, operated by the Lincoln Parish Museum & Historical Society
Log Cabin Museum	Shongaloo	Webster	Northwest	History	
Longfellow-Evangeline State Historic Site	St. Martinville	St. Martin	Cajun Heartland	Open air	Includes a reproduction 1800 period Acadian farmstead with outbuildings, and the 1815 Maison Olivier plantation home
Louisiana Art and Science Museum	Baton Rouge	East Baton Rouge	Baton Rouge area	Multiple	Art, science, astronomy, natural history
Louisiana Children's Discovery Center	Hammond	Tangipahoa	Baton Rouge area	Children's	website
Louisiana Governor's Mansion	Baton Rouge	East Baton Rouge	Baton Rouge area	Historic house	1963 official residence of the governor of Louisiana
Louisiana Military Hall of Fame and Museum	Abbeville	Vermilion	Cajun Heartland	Military	website, Louisiana veterans, focus is World War II, located at the Abbeville Chris Crusta Memorial Airport
Louisiana History Museum	Alexandria	Rapides	Central	History	State and local history
Louisiana Maneuvers and Military Museum	Pineville	Rapides	Central	Military	website, located at Louisiana National Guard Training Center Pineville, history of the Louisiana National Guard
Louisiana Military Museum	Ruston	Lincoln	Northeast	Military	website
Louisiana Museum of Natural History	Baton Rouge	East Baton Rouge	Baton Rouge area	Natural history	Part of Louisiana State University, exhibits in the Textile and Costume Museum, and the Museum of Natural Science
Louisiana Orphan Train Museum	Opelousas	St. Landry	Cajun Heartland	History	website, history of the Orphan Train riders from the New York Foundling Hospital to Louisiana between the years 1873 and 1929
Louisiana Political Museum and Hall of Fame	Winnfield	Winn	Central	History	Important Louisiana politicians and memorabilia
Louisiana Sports Hall of Fame & Northwest Louisiana History Museum	Natchitoches	Natchitoches	Central	Sports	Branch of the Louisiana State Museum, accomplishments by Louisiana athletes, coaches and sports stars
Louisiana State Archive and Research Library	Baton Rouge	East Baton Rouge	Baton Rouge area	Art	Changing displays from its collections
Louisiana State Capitol	Baton Rouge	East Baton Rouge	Baton Rouge area	History	website
Louisiana State Cotton Museum	Lake Providence	East Carroll	Northeast	Agriculture	website, 7-acre (28,000 m^{2}) museum complex includes planter's house, sharecropper's cabin, outhouse, commissary, general store, church, and museum exhibit hall
Louisiana State Exhibit Museum	Shreveport	Caddo	Northwest	History	website, Louisiana history and culture
Louisiana State Oil and Gas Museum	Oil City	Caddo	Northwest	Industry	website, exhibits include area oil and gas industry, Caddo Indians
Louisiana Swamp Pop Museum	Ville Platte	Evangeline	Cajun Heartland	Local history	Features Swamp pop memorabilia from the 1950s/1960s
Louisiana Telephone Pioneer Museum	Jennings	Jefferson Davis	Southwest	Technology	Also known as the Children's Telephone Museum, located in the same building as the W. H. Tupper General Merchandise Museum
LSU Galleries	Baton Rouge	East Baton Rouge	Baton Rouge area	Art	website, operated by Louisiana State University, the Glassell Gallery is located at the Shaw Center for the Arts, the Foster Gallery is on campus in Foster Hall, Union Art Gallery in the LSU Student Union
LSU Museum of Art	Baton Rouge	East Baton Rouge	Baton Rouge area	Art	Operated by Louisiana State University at the Shaw Center for the Arts
LSU Pioneer Heritage Center	Shreveport	Caddo	Northwest	Open air	website, open by appointment, operated by Louisiana State University
LSU Rural Life Museum	Baton Rouge	East Baton Rouge	Baton Rouge area	Open air	Includes 19th century plantation buildings, examples of different Louisiana buildings, and a barn with tools, household items and antique equipment
Madisonville Museum	Madisonville	St. Tammany	Baton Rouge area	Local history	Located in a historic courthouse
Magnolia Mound Plantation	Baton Rouge	East Baton Rouge	Baton Rouge area	Historic house	Early 19th century plantation house and outbuildings
Magnolia Plantation	Derry	Natchitoches	Central	Open air	Part of Cane River Creole National Historical Park, mid 19th century plantation
Maison Jean Marie Laran Museum	Ville Platte	Evangeline	Cajun Heartland	Local history	Historic 1880s home filled with festival artefacts, period antiques and a collection of videos of persons born and raised in Evangeline Parish
Mansfield Female College Museum	Mansfield	DeSoto	Northwest	Education	website, history and memorabilia of the first women's institute of higher learning west of the Mississippi River
Mansfield State Historic Site	Mansfield	DeSoto	Northwest	Military	Museum and preserved site of the American Civil War Battle of Mansfield
Mardi Gras Museum of Imperial Calcasieu	Lake Charles	Calcasieu	Southwest	Amusement	website, Mardi Gras costumes, located inside the Central School Arts & Humanities Center
Marksville State Historic Site	Marksville	Avoyelles	Central	Archaeology	Prehistoric Indian mounds and museum
Marlene Yu Museum	Shreveport	Caddo	Northwest	Art	website, life and works of artist Marlene Tseng Yu
Martin Home Place Museum	Columbia	Caldwell	Northeast	Living	Late 19th-century cotton plantation house with demonstrations of farm life
Masur Museum of Art	Monroe	Ouachita	Northeast	Art	Visual arts
Meadows Museum of Art	Shreveport	Caddo	Northwest	Art	Part of Centenary College
Melrose Plantation	Melrose	Natchitoches	Central	Historic house	1830s plantation built by and for free blacks
Merryville Museum	Merryville	Beauregard	Southwest	Local history	website, operated by the Merryville Historical Society
Mooringsport Mini Museum	Mooringsport	Caddo	Northwest	Local history	website, photographs, paintings, prints and artifacts of local history
Multicultural Center of the South	Shreveport	Caddo	Northwest	Culture	Includes art and cultural exhibits from many cultures
Museum of Political History	Baton Rouge	East Baton Rouge	Baton Rouge area	History	Housed in the Old Louisiana State Capitol, exhibits on Louisiana's political history
Museum of the Acadian Memorial	St. Martinville	St. Martin	Cajun Heartland	Ethnic	website, Acadian culture and migration to Louisiana
Museum of West Louisiana	Leesville	Vernon	Southwest	Open-air	Complex includes the 1917 Kansas City Southern Railway Depot, railroad section house, shotgun house, 1850s dogtrot house, and pioneer style barn
Myrtles Plantation	St. Francisville	West Feliciana	Baton Rouge area	Historic house	1796 plantation bed and breakfast open for tours
National Hansen's Disease Museum	Carville	Iberville	Greater New Orleans	Medical	Former sugar plantation and leprosy hospital
Northeast Louisiana Children's Museum	Monroe	Ouachita	Northeast	Children's	website
Northeast Louisiana Delta African American Heritage Museum	Monroe	Ouachita	Northeast	African American	
Nottoway Plantation	White Castle	Iberville	Baton Rouge area	Historic House	1859 plantation mansion
Oak Alley Plantation	Vacherie	St. James	Baton Rouge area	Historic house	19th century sugar cane plantation
Oakland Plantation	Natchitoches	Natchitoches	Central	Open air	Part of Cane River Creole National Historical Park
Oaklawn Manor	Franklin	St. Mary	Cajun Heartland	Historic house	Mid 19th century plantation mansion
Old Arsenal Museum	Baton Rouge	East Baton Rouge	Baton Rouge area	Military	website, exhibits about historic powder magazine and the history of the State Capitol grounds
Old Louisiana Governor's Mansion	Baton Rouge	East Baton Rouge	Baton Rouge area	Historic house	Modeled after the White House
Old Town Hall Museum	Pineville	Rapides	Central	History	Restored 1935 town hall, exhibits about municipal government
Opelousas Museum and Interpretive Center	Opelousas	St. Landry	Cajun Heartland	Local history	website
Ormond Plantation House	Destrehan	St. Charles	Greater New Orleans	Historic house	18th century plantation home featuring historic life and architecture
Paul and Lulu Hilliard University Art Museum	Lafayette	Lafayette	Cajun Heartland	Art	Part of the University of Louisiana at Lafayette, collection includes 18th through 21st century European, Asian and American art
Plaquemine Lock State Historic Site	Plaquemine	Iberville	Baton Rouge area	Transportation	Historic canal lock and lockhouse museum
Pointe Coupee Parish Museum	New Roads	Pointe Coupee	Baton Rouge area	Historic house	Creole house
Port Hudson State Historic Site	Port Hudson	East Feliciana	Baton Rouge area	Military	Museum and site of the longest siege in American history during the American Civil War from May 23 through July 9, 1863
Poverty Point State Historic Site	Pioneer	West Carroll	Northeast	Archaeology	Prehistoric mounds and museum
Prairie Acadian Cultural Center	Eunice	Acadia	Cajun Heartland	Culture	Includes Cajun history, language, music, architecture, clothing, religion, cuisine and farming, part of Jean Lafitte National Historical Park and Preserve
Rebel State Historic Site	Marthaville	Natchitoches	Central	Music	Country and folk music performers, history and instruments
Red River Crossroads Museum	Gilliam	Caddo	Northwest	Local history	Located in the Shreve Memorial Library, open by appointment only
Republic of West Florida Museum	Jackson	East Feliciana	Baton Rouge area	Local history	website, includes Civil War and military artifacts, antique cars, planes and carriages, Antebellum furnishings, ship models, wildlife, and musical instruments
River Road African American Museum	Donaldsonville	Ascension	Baton Rouge area	African American	History, culture and contributions of African Americans in Louisiana
Rivertown	Kenner	Jefferson	Greater New Orleans	Multiple	website, 12 block historic district that includes the Rivertown Science Complex, Kenner Heritage Park
Rosedown Plantation State Historic Site	St. Francisville	West Feliciana	Baton Rouge area	Historic house	19th century plantation
R. W. Norton Art Gallery	Shreveport	Caddo	Northwest	Art	Collection includes American and European fine art, sculpture and decorative arts
Sam Guarino Blacksmith Shop Museum	Abbeville	Vermilion	Cajun Heartland	History	1920s period blacksmith shop
San Francisco Plantation	Garyville	St. John the Baptist	Baton Rouge area	Historic house	1850s period plantation house
Schepis Museum	Columbia	Caldwell	Northeast	Multiple	Local art and history
Sci-Port Discovery Center	Shreveport	Caddo	Northwest	Science	website, includes hands-on science and math exhibits, a space planetarium and domed IMAX Theater
Shadows-on-the-Teche	New Iberia	Iberia	Cajun Heartland	Historic house	19th century plantation home and gardens, operated by the National Trust for Historic Preservation
Sherman Fine Arts Center	Lake Charles	Calcasieu	Southwest	Art	website, part of McNeese State University, includes the Grand Gallery
Shreveport Railroad Museum	Shreveport	Caddo	Northwest	Railroad	website, History of railroads in and around Shreveport since 1860, operated by the Red River Valley Railroad Historical Society
Shreveport Water Works Museum	Shreveport	Caddo	Northwest	Technology	Former water pumping station with preserved steam machinery
Simmesport Fishing Industry Museum	Simmesport	Avoyelles	Central	Maritime	Displays in the local library on fishing customs and traditions along the Atchafalaya River
Slidell Cultural Center	Slidell	St. Tammany	Greater New Orleans	Multiple	Changing exhibits of art, history and science, located in City Hall
Slidell Mardi Gras Museum	Slidell	St. Tammany	Greater New Orleans	Amusement	Accessed through the Slidell Museum, feature Carnival memorabilia including dresses, costumes, scepters, goblets and throws and historical scrapbooks
Slidell Museum	Slidell	St. Tammany	Greater New Orleans	Local history	website, located in the old town jail
Snyder Museum	Bastrop	Morehouse	Northeast	Local history	website, local history, arts center
Southdown Plantation House	Houma	Terrebonne	Baton Rouge area	Local history	19th-century sugar manor house and home to the Terrebonne Museum with exhibits of local history, period displays and Native American culture
Southern Forest Heritage Museum	Long Leaf	Rapides	Central	Industry	website, lumber industry, features 57-acre (230,000 m^{2}) complete sawmill facility with steam-powered logging and milling equipment
Southern University Museum of Art in Baton Rouge	Baton Rouge	East Baton Rouge	Baton Rouge area	Art	Operated by Southern University, African and African American art
Southern University Museum of Art in Shreveport	Shreveport	Caddo	Northwest	Art	Operated by Southern University, African and African American art
Spring Street Historical Museum	Shreveport	Caddo	Northwest	Local history	website
St. James Culture and Heritage Center	Lutcher	St. James	Greater New Orleans	Local history	
St. Joseph Plantation	Vacherie	St. James	Baton Rouge area	Historic house	19th century plantation
St. Martinville Cultural Heritage Center	St. Martinville	St. Martin	Cajun Heartland	Multiple	Includes the African American Museum and the Museum of the Acadian Memorial
Stage of Stars Museum	Shreveport	Caddo	Northwest	Media	website, stars who have performed at the Shreveport Municipal Auditorium
Stagecoach Trail Museum	Mount Lebanon	Bienville	Northwest	Local history	Operated by the Mount Lebanon Historical Society
Stephens African American Museum	Shreveport	Caddo	Northwest	African American	website
TABASCO Pepper Sauce Museum	Avery Island	New Iberia	Southeast	Brand History	Owned and Operated by McIlhenny Company producers of Tabasco sauce, https://www.tabasco.com/visit-avery-island/
Talbot Museum	Bossier City	Bossier	Northwest	Medical	Located in the Willis-Knighton Innovation Center, history of modern medicine and important area health figures
Tangipahoa African American Heritage Museum	Hammond	Tangipahoa	Baton Rouge area	African American	
Tee Joe Gonzales Museum	Gonzales	Ascension	Baton Rouge area	Historic house	Open by appointment, home of Tee Joe Gonzales, the founding father of Gonzales
Tioga Heritage Park and Museum	Pineville	Rapides	Central	Local history	website, preserved commissary building with exhibits of area history
Touchstone Wildlife and Art Museum	Haughton	Bossier	Northwest	Natural history	website, mounted animal dioramas
Tunica-Biloxi Tribal Museum	Marksville	Avoyelles	Central	Native American	History and culture of the Tunica-Biloxi, including artifacts from the Tunica treasure
ULM Museum of Natural History	Monroe	Ouachita	Northeast	Natural history	website, part of the University of Louisiana at Monroe, natural history of North Louisiana, mounts of African, North American, and Asian animals, rocks, gems, and minerals, models and fossils of dinosaurs, ancient vertebrates, invertebrates, plants, area Native American artifacts
USS Kidd & Veterans Memorial	Baton Rouge	East Baton Rouge	Baton Rouge area	Maritime	Fletcher class destroyer museum ship
USS Orleck Naval Museum	Lake Charles	Calcasieu	Southwest	Maritime	Gearing-class destroyer museum ship
Varnado Store Museum	Franklinton	Washington	Baton Rouge area	Local history	Historic store with changing exhibits of local history and art
Vermilionville Historic Village	Lafayette	Lafayette	Cajun Heartland	Living	website, Cajun/Creole heritage and folklife park recreates life in the Acadiana area between 1765 and 1890
Vivian Railroad Station Museum	Vivian	Caddo	Northwest	Railroad	Historic depot with area railroad and local history displays, operated by the Historical Society of North Caddo
W. H. Tupper General Merchandise Museum	Jennings	Jefferson Davis	Southwest	History	website, 20th century general store with household and local cultural items and antiques, antique toys, Coushatta pine needle baskets
Washington Museum & Tourist Center	Washington	St. Landry	Baton Rouge area	Local history	
Wedell-Williams Aviation & Cypress Sawmill Museum	Patterson	St. Mary	Cajun Heartland	Multiple	Exhibits on aviation and the cypress lumber industry, branch of the Louisiana State Museum
Welsh Museum	Welsh	Jefferson Davis	Southwest	Local history	
West Baton Rouge Museum	Port Allen	West Baton Rouge	Baton Rouge area	Multiple	website, includes the 1830s period Aillet House, plantation and shotgun cabins, local history displays
West Feliciana Historical Society Museum	St. Francisville	West Feliciana	Baton Rouge area	Local history	
Westwego Historical Museum	Westwego	Jefferson	Greater New Orleans	Local history	Features an early 20th-century period hardware store, furnished upstairs living quarters with antique furniture
Winter Quarters State Historic Site	Newellton	Tensas	Northeast	Historic house	Antebellum period cotton plantation house
Zachary Historic Village	Zachary	East Baton Rouge	Baton Rouge area	Open air	website, Eight buildings in a two block area, features Historic Zachary Depot, The Old Town Hall and the Annison House
Zigler Art Museum	Jennings	Jefferson Davis	Southwest	Art	Includes major movements in art from the Middle Ages to the present

== Defunct museums ==
- Ark-La-Tex Antique and Classic Vehicle Museum, Shreveport
- Arna Bontemps African American Museum, Alexandria
- Barnwell Garden & Art Center, Shreveport, closed in 2012
- Fort Pike State Historic Site, New Orleans, closed indefinitely due to damage from Hurricane Katrina
- Historic Donaldsonville Museum, Donaldsonville
- New Orleans Jazz Museum, collections now part of the Louisiana State Museum
- Old Courthouse Museum, Natchitoches
- Opelousas Museum of Art
- Pentagon Barracks Museum, Baton Rouge
- Port Allen Railroad Depot, Port Allen
- Robert Gentry Museum, Many
- Shreveport Firefighter's Museum, Shreveport

== See also ==
- Arboreta in Louisiana (category)
- Aquaria in Louisiana (category)
- Botanical gardens in Louisiana (category)
- Historic landmarks in Louisiana
- List of historical societies in Louisiana
- Houses in Louisiana (category)
- Forts in Louisiana (category)
- Museums list
- Nature Centers in Louisiana
- Observatories in Louisiana (category)
- Registered Historic Places in Louisiana

== Resources ==
- Louisiana Association of Museums
