= Bonnie and Clyde (disambiguation) =

Bonnie and Clyde refers to the American outlaw couple Bonnie Parker and Clyde Barrow.

Bonnie and Clyde or Bonnie & Clyde may also refer to:

== Film and television ==
- Bonnie and Clyde (film), a 1967 film starring Warren Beatty and Faye Dunaway
- "Bonnie & Clyde", a 2004 episode of the American animated television series Lilo & Stitch: The Series
- Bonnie and Clyde (miniseries), a 2013 television film starring Emile Hirsch and Holliday Grainger
- "Bonnie & Clyde", a 2016 episode of the documentary television series American Experience
- "The Last Ride of Bonnie & Clyde", a 2016 episode of the American television series Timeless

== Music ==
- Bonnie X Clyde, a Miami-based electronic dance music band

=== Albums ===
- Bonnie and Clyde (Messy Marv and Marvaless album), 2003
- Bonnie and Clyde (Serge Gainsbourg and Brigitte Bardot album), 1968
- The Legend of Bonnie & Clyde, a 1968 album by Merle Haggard and the Strangers
- The Story of Bonnie and Clyde, a 1968 album by Flatt and Scruggs and the Foggy Mountain Boys

=== Songs ===
- "Bonnie and Clyde" (Serge Gainsbourg and Brigitte Bardot song), 1968
- "Bonnie and Clyde II", a 2002 song by Martina Sorbara from the album The Cure For Bad Deeds
- "Bonnie & Clyde" (Sarah Connor and Henning Wehland song), 2016
- "Bonnie & Clyde" (Die Toten Hosen song), 1996
- "Bonnie & Clyde" (Loredana and Mozzik song), 2018
- "Bonnie & Clyde", a 2021 song by Song Yuqi
- "Bonnie & Clyde", a 2016 song by South Korean singer Dean
- "Bonnie & Clyde (Part II)", a song by rapper Foxy Brown featuring Jay-Z from the album Chyna Doll, 1999
- "Clyde & Bonnie", a 2022 song by Tai Verdes from the album HDTV
- "The Bonnie and Clyde Theme", a song by rapper Yo-Yo featuring Ice Cube from the album You Better Ask Somebody, 1993
- "The Ballad of Bonnie and Clyde", a 1967 song by Georgie Fame
- "The Legend of Bonnie and Clyde" (song), a 1968 song by Merle Haggard and the Strangers
- "'97 Bonnie & Clyde", a 1999 song by Eminem
- "'03 Bonnie & Clyde", a 2002 song by Jay-Z featuring Beyoncé

== Museums ==
- Bonnie & Clyde Ambush Museum located in the small Louisiana town where the couple were killed.

== Other uses ==
- Bonnie & Clyde (musical), a 2009 musical by Frank Wildhorn and Don Black
- "Bonnie and Clyde Syndrome", another name for hybristophilia
