= Alexandre Mouton House =

Historic house in Louisiana, United States

- U.S. National Register of Historic Places
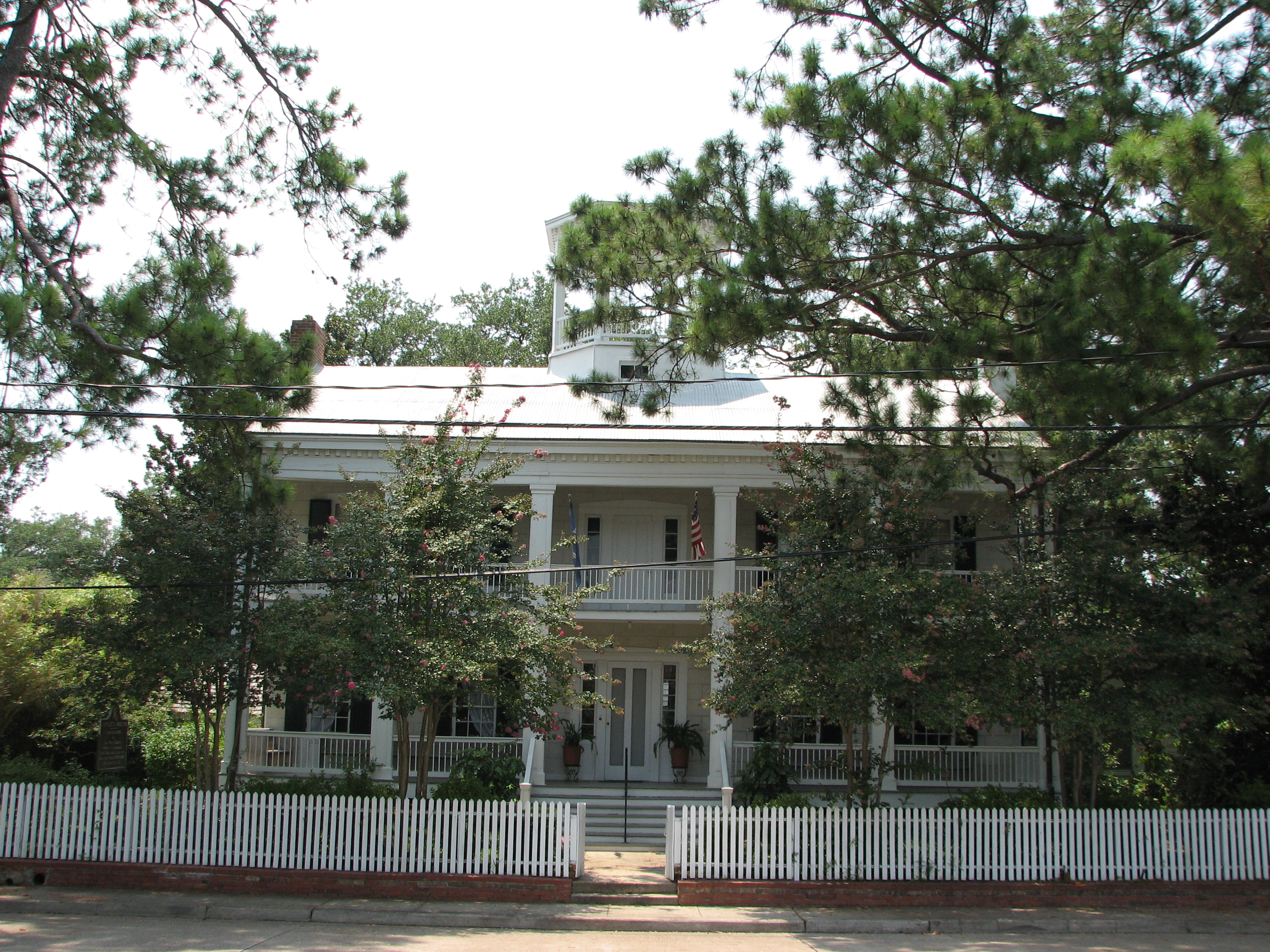

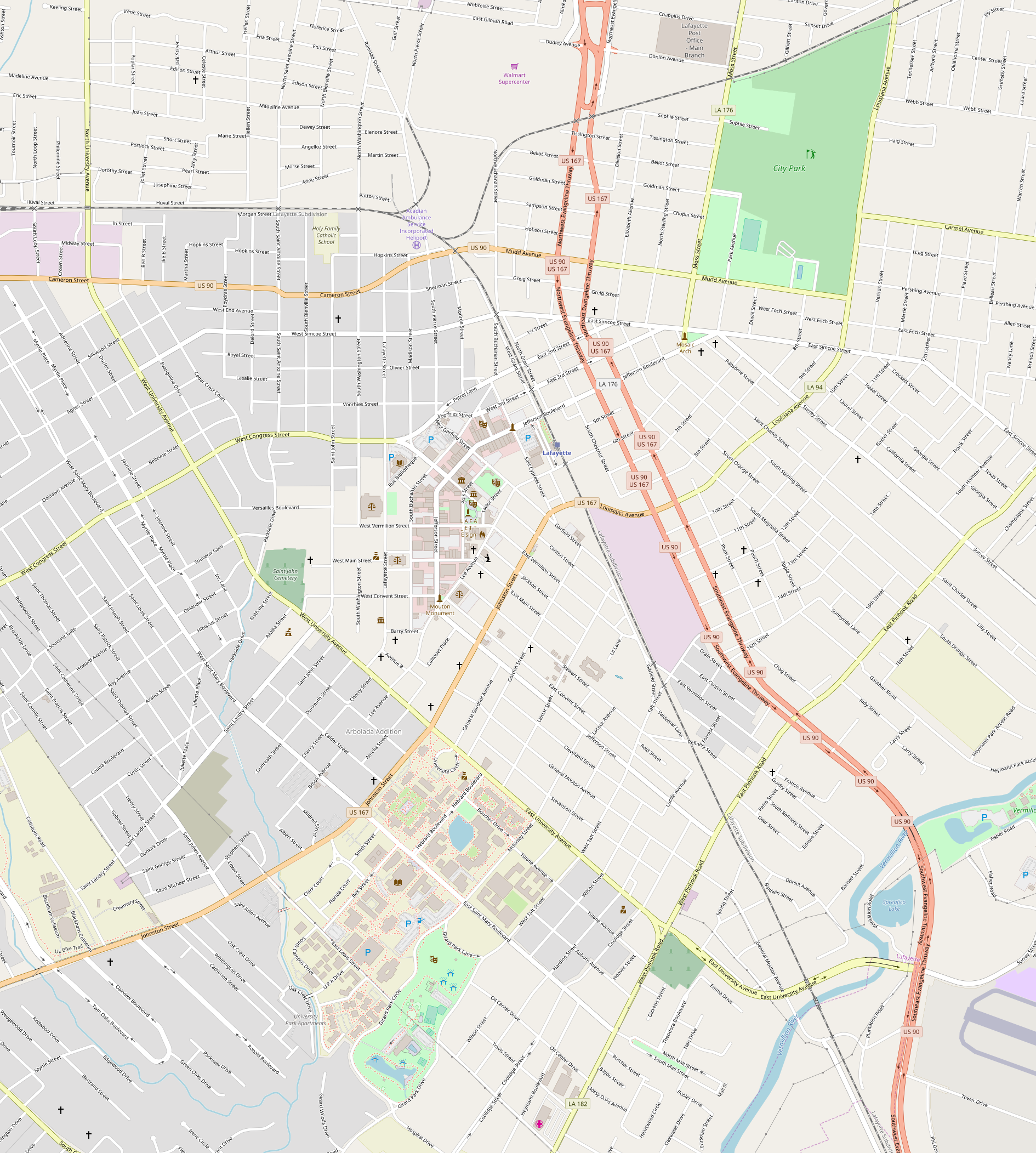
- Location within Lafayette
- Location: 1122 Lafayette Street, Lafayette, Louisiana
- Coordinates: 30°13′15″N 92°01′16″W
- Area: less than one acre
- Built: c.1800
- Built by: Jean Mouton
- NRHP reference No.: 75000850
- Added to NRHP: June 18, 1975

The Alexandre Mouton House, also called the Lafayette Museum (French: Maison d'Alexandre Mouton, or Musée de Lafayette), is a historic house located at 1122 Lafayette Street in Lafayette, Louisiana. It was the home of 11th Governor and first Democratic Governor of Louisiana Alexandre Mouton, and it is also associated with other historic families.

It was added to the National Register of Historic Places on June 18, 1975. The listing included three contributing buildings: the two-story main house with an attic and cupola and wooden porches on its first and second floors, an Acadian house connected by a covered wooden porch, and a brick smoke house. The first two have cypress siding and are of briquette entre poteaux construction.

The original house, consisting of one room and a kitchen, was built in about 1800 by Jean Mouton, one of the earliest settlers in the Attakapas country, and father of Alexandre Mouton.

== See also ==
- National Register of Historic Places listings in Lafayette Parish, Louisiana
- List of museums in Louisiana
