= Armand Broussard House =

- Amant Broussard House
- U.S. National Register of Historic Places
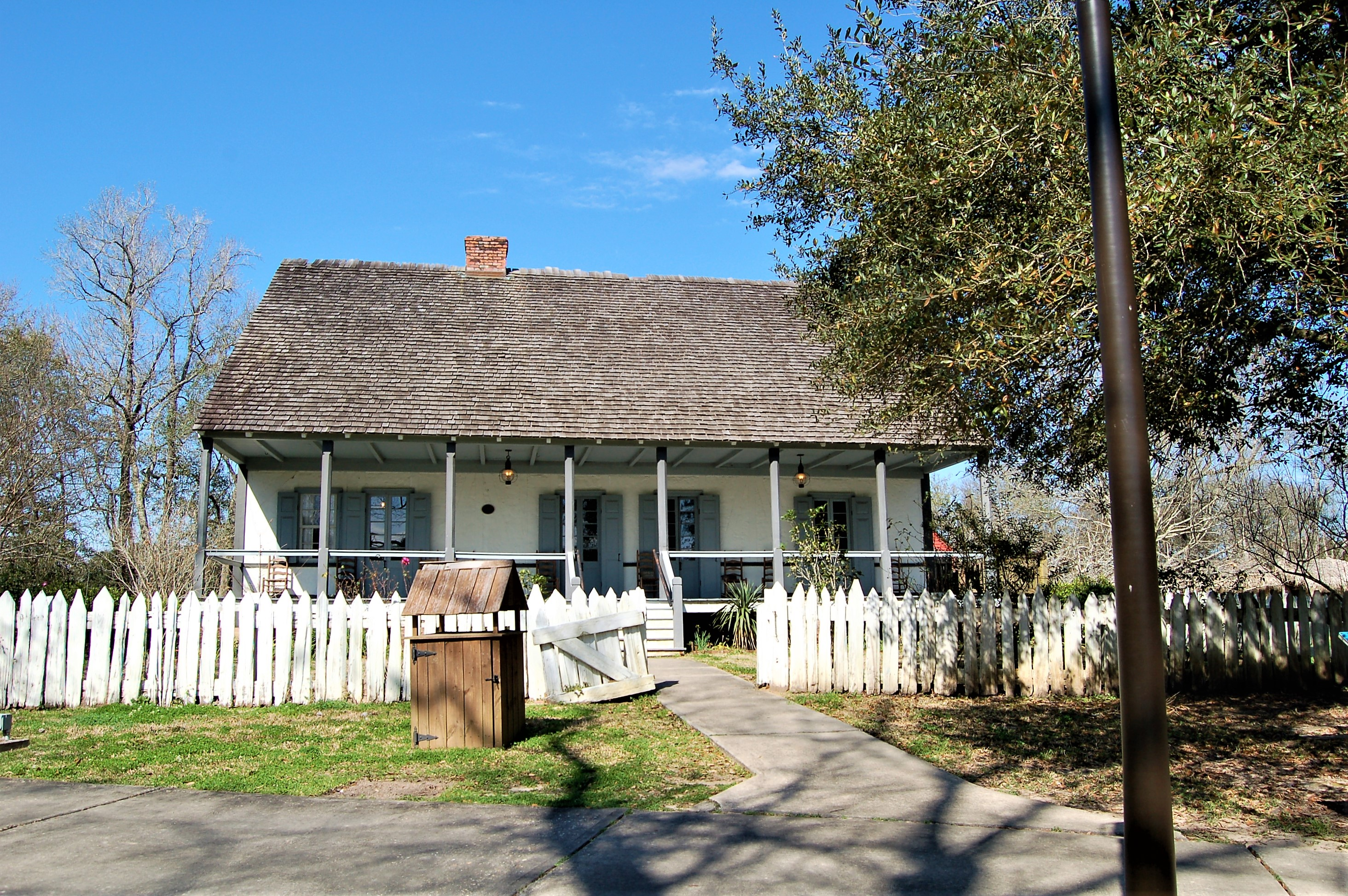

- Location within Louisiana
- Location: Vermilionville 300 Fisher Rd., Lafayette, Louisiana
- Coordinates: 29°59′36″N 91°47′40″W
- Area: 0.3 acres (0.12 ha)
- Built: 1790
- Architectural style: Raised Creole cottage
- NRHP reference No.: 80001729
- Added to NRHP: June 9, 1980

Amand Broussard House is a historic house at Vermilionville 300 Fisher Road Lafayette, Louisiana. It may be the oldest surviving Cajun house. It was built around 1790 and added to the National Register of Historic Places on June 9, 1980.

== History ==
The Armand Broussard House was originally built at Fausse Point in what was then the Province of Louisiana in New Spain. The Broussard family owned it until 1979 when Dr. Roy Boucvalt purchased it and relocated it to New Iberia to prevent demolition. The next year it was added to the National Register of Historic Places in Iberia Parish. In 1988, Dr. Boucvalt donated the historic structure to Vermilionville Historic Village. The house was then relocated a second time to the museum site in the City of Lafayette within Lafayette Parish.

== Architecture ==
The house was built in a Creole cottage architecture style. Being a relatively large family home, Armand Broussard House was built with all of the extra amenities available at the time in the wilderness of Southwest Louisiana. Some of these amenities included the deep front porch with chamfered posts and a floor plan featuring more than two rooms wide across the front with direct access to the front porch. Houses like this one were only two rooms deep to maximize air flow. The cornices and wood trim on windows, doors and at the edges of each wall, as well as wainscoting and chair rails are amenities that suggest the owners had some prosperity. Also, the “cabinets” or small rooms that close in one or both sides of the rear porch were also considered amenities for the more affluent. Armand Broussard House is one of the largest extant examples of colombage and bousillage construction.

== See also ==
- List of the oldest buildings in Louisiana
- National Register of Historic Places listings in Iberia Parish, Louisiana
- National Register of Historic Places listings in Lafayette Parish, Louisiana
