= Bontemps African American Museum =

Museum in Alexandria, Louisiana, U.S.

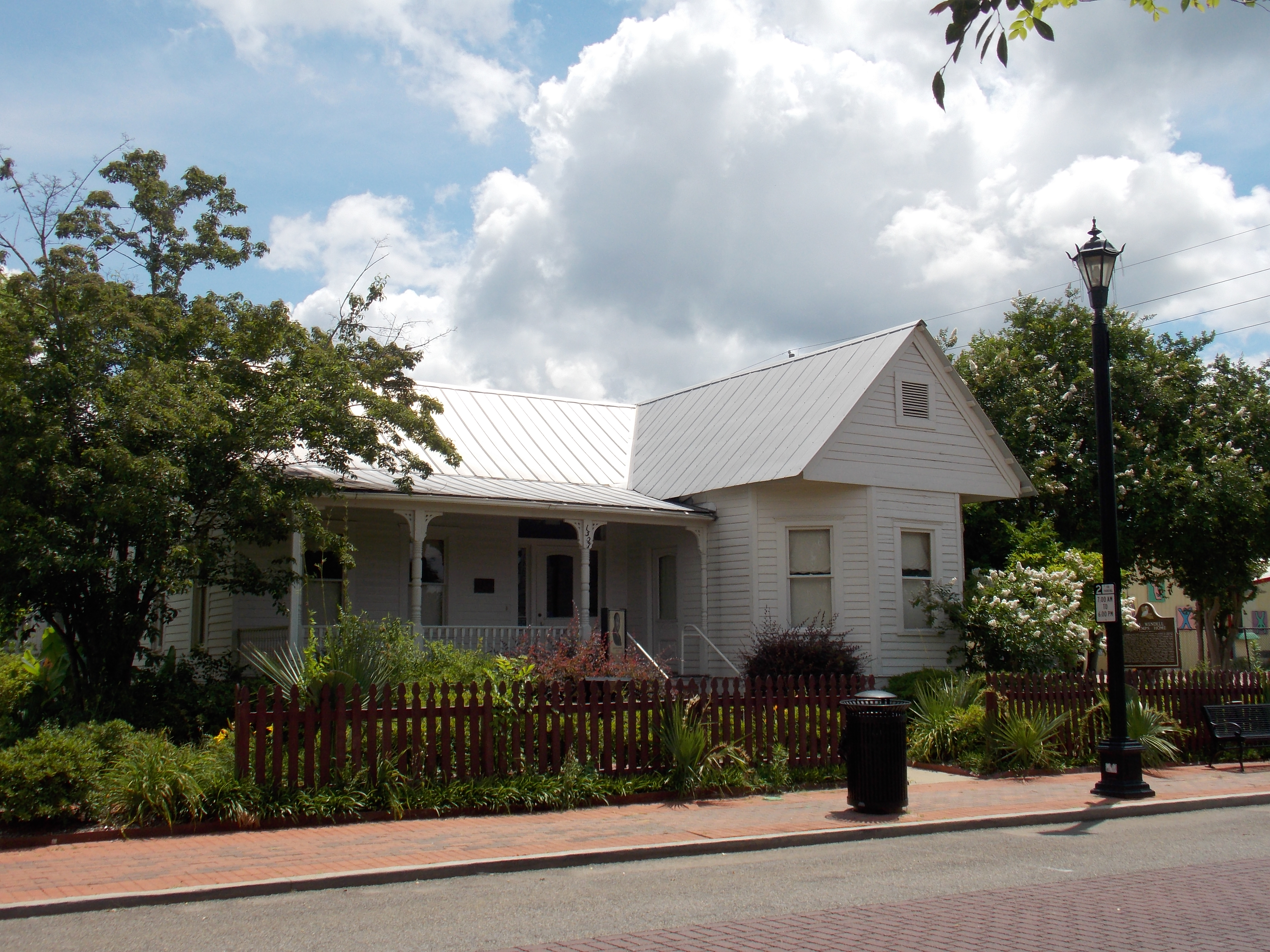
- Historic house, 2014
- Established: 1992
- Dissolved: 2020s
- Location: 1327 3rd Street; Alexandria, Louisiana 71301
- Coordinates: 31.309583°N 92.4448507°W
- Type: Historic house, biographical, & poetry museum
- Collections: Arna Bontemps

The Arna Bontemps African American Museum was a museum in the United States city of Alexandria, Louisiana. The museum was housed in the restored home that was the birthplace of the poet Arna Bontemps, renowned as one of the leaders of the Harlem Renaissance.

The museum and cultural center was located at 1327 3rd Street, and was featured on the Louisiana African American Heritage Trail. It opened in 1992.

== See also ==
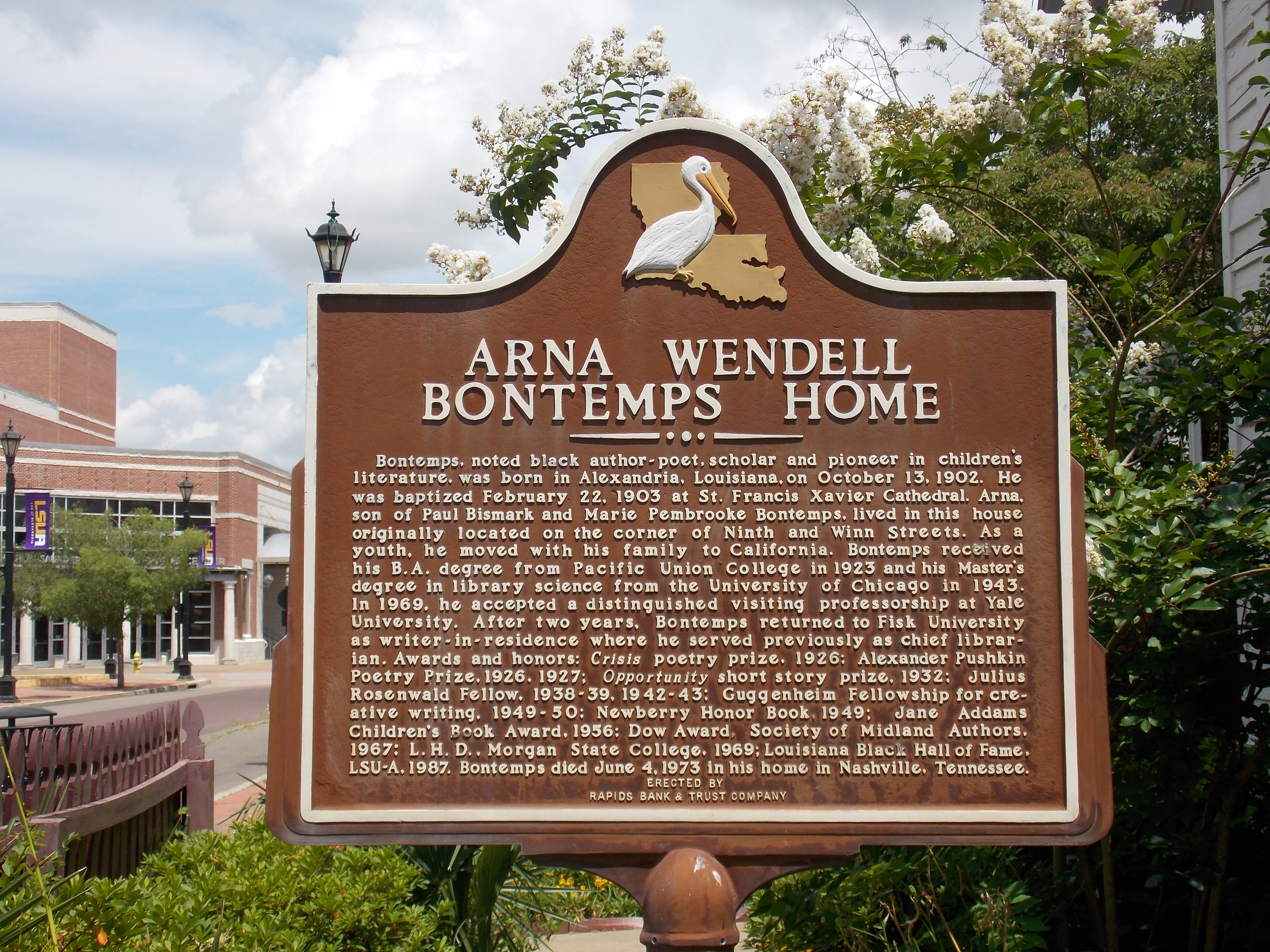
State historical marker

- List of museums in Louisiana
- List of museums focused on African Americans
