= Abita Mystery House =

Roadside attraction and folk art museum in Abita Springs, Louisiana

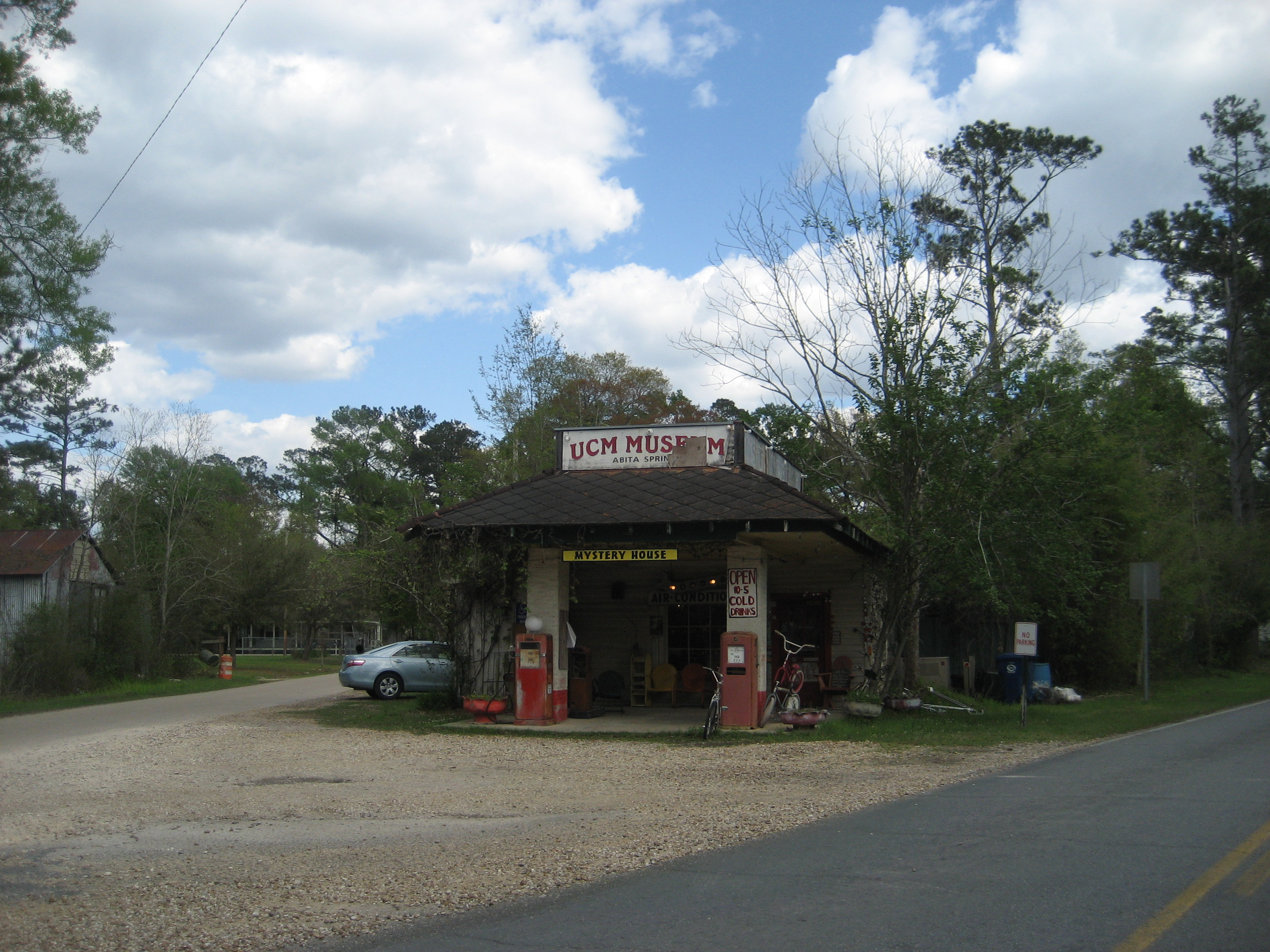
- "Louisiana's Most Eccentric Attraction"
- Established: 2007
- Location: Abita Springs, Louisiana
- Coordinates: 30.4769°N 90.0356°W
- Owner: John Preble
- Website: abitamysteryhouse.com

The Abita Mystery House, previously known as the UCM Museum is a roadside attraction and self-guided folk art museum located in Abita Springs, Louisiana, United States. It features thousands of handmade displays and oddities created by artist and inventor John Preble.

== History and features ==
The attraction was created and is maintained by Preble, who was inspired by the Tinkertown Museum in New Mexico. The museum offers a collection of folk art objects ranging from interactive miniatures and pottery to Louisiana-themed sculptures such as Darrel the Dogigator (half alligator, half dog), Edmond the Allisapien (half alligator, half Homo sapiens), and Buford the Bassigator (half bass, half alligator).

Originally called the UCM Museum (the "you-see-em" Museum) until its official name change in 2007, the site begins with a vintage gas station, featuring old filling pumps and bright decor, and extends to open-air sections, the main exhibition hall, a ninety-year-old Creole cottage, and the House of Shards. There is also an Airstream trailer, with a flying saucer lodged in the side. The attraction is known for its eclectic aesthetic and offbeat appeal. John Bullard, director of the New Orleans Museum of Art, described it as "the most intriguing and provocative museum in Louisiana." The museum also features a gift shop, stocking items made by local artists.

== In the Media ==
The Abita Mystery House has been featured in books and on television. The History Channel series American Pickers featured the museum in the August 12, 2013, episode "Louisiana Purchase."
