= Baton Rouge Gallery =

Multimedia art gallery and artist co-op

Baton Rouge Gallery, founded in 1966 (60 years ago), is a multi-media art gallery located in Baton Rouge, Louisiana's historic City Park. Baton Rouge Gallery is one of the United States' oldest artist co-ops and an important aspect of Baton Rouge's arts community.

== History ==
The Baton Rouge Gallery was founded in 1966 when eight artists formed a gallery to showcase not only their own work but also that of other local artists. The original eight were reflected in the gallery's original name, The Unit 8 Gallery. The gallery gained incorporation in 1966, having grown to include twelve artists, and became known as Baton Rouge Gallery. In 1984, the gallery moved to City Park. The pavilion where the gallery is located was originally the park's pool house, built in the 1920s and closed in 1963.

When the Gallery celebrated its Silver anniversary in January 1991, its 25 years of operation were believed to be a record for a unique art gallery and the gallery's development mirrored that of Baton Rouge's arts community. Until a brief closing in April 1994 due to a controversy over an artist's work, the gallery was the nation's oldest professionally run artist co-op and still remains one of the longest-running.

Today, the gallery not only has an artist member roster of over 50 contemporary artists who work in a wide array of mediums, but also offers a wealth of programming that have become favorites in and around the greater Baton Rouge area, including its Movies & Music on the Lawn program. The gallery also hosts national and regional juried exhibitions throughout the year including the Surreal Salon (January, highlighting the quality & popularity of contemporary surrealism and the pop-surrealist movement in the United States), the Flatscape Video Art Series (February, featuring contemporary works in video art from across the U.S.) the CFA REAL-LIFE EXPERIENCE Juried High School Exhibition (April, honoring the work of high school students in East Baton Rouge Parish) and Venus Envy (April, celebrating the work of female artists living in Louisiana, Texas, Arkansas, Alabama, Mississippi, Georgia and Florida.)
