= Vermilionville Historic Village =

Living history museum

Coordinates: 30°12′55″N 91°59′41″W

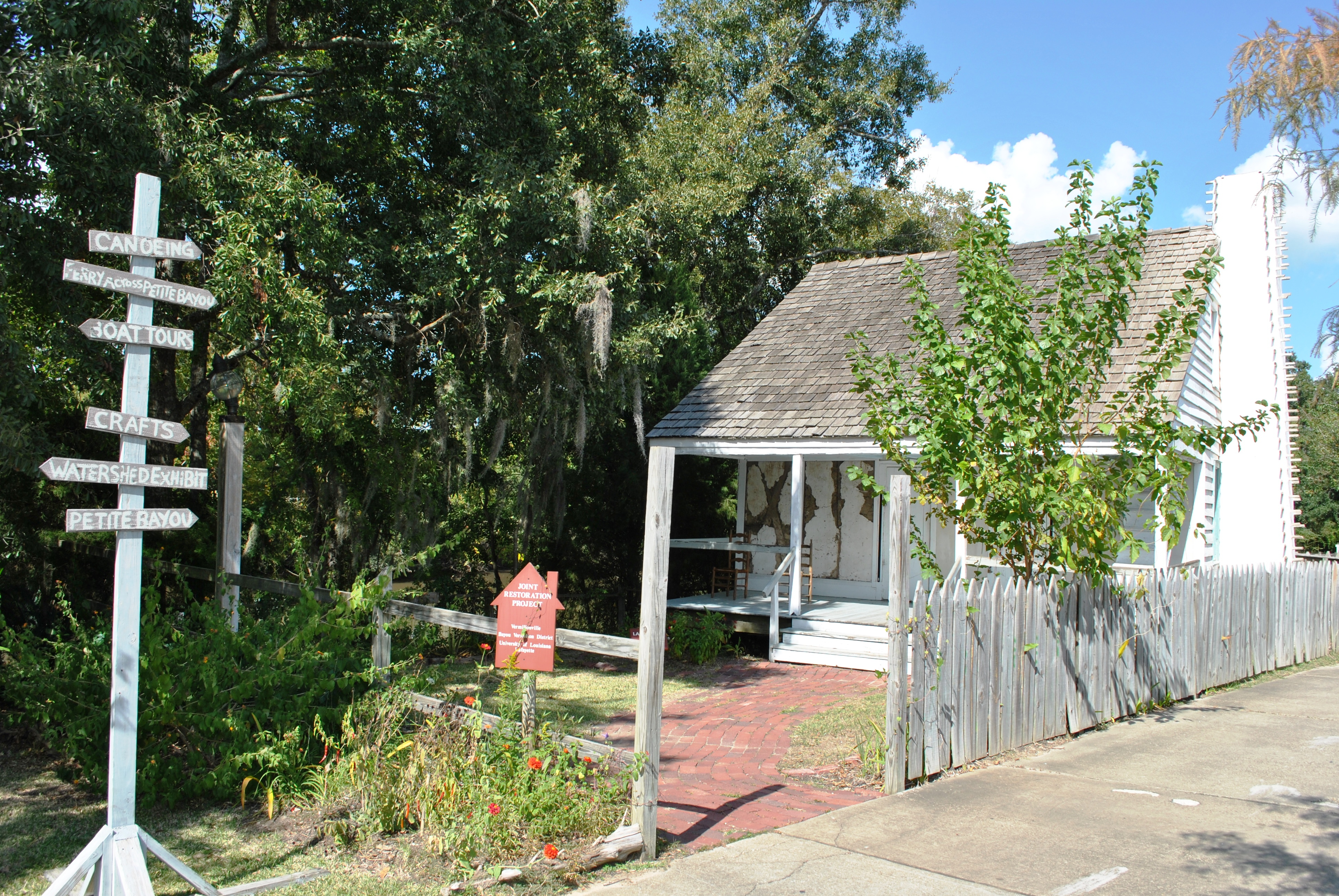
Maison des Cultures, Vermilionville Historic Village

Vermilionville Historic Village, located in Lafayette, Louisiana, is a Cajun and Louisiana Creole living history museum with a combination of restored and replica historic structures.

== Structures and exhibits ==
Buildings in the village include:

- Maison Acadienne - Circa 1830
- La Chapelle des Attakapas - a reproduction of the style based on the Catholic churches at Pointe Coupée (1760) and St. Martinville (1773)
- Beau Bassin - Circa 1840, Creole and American Greek Revival style
- Maison Boucvalt - Circa 1860, a classic 19th century Acadian/Creole house
- Maison Broussard - 1790, original French Creole house, listed on the National Register of Historic Places
- Maison Buller - 1803, Creole style
- Maison des Cultures - Circa 1840, Acadian style
- L’École - a reproduction typical of 1890s schoolhouse architecture
- Maison Mouton - a reconstruction of an 1810 house, a basic Acadian house with a detached kitchen
- Trapper's Cabin

== See also ==
- Acadian Village (park), also in Lafayette
- Attakapas Church, one of the churches La Chapelle des Attakapas is modeled after

== Gallery ==
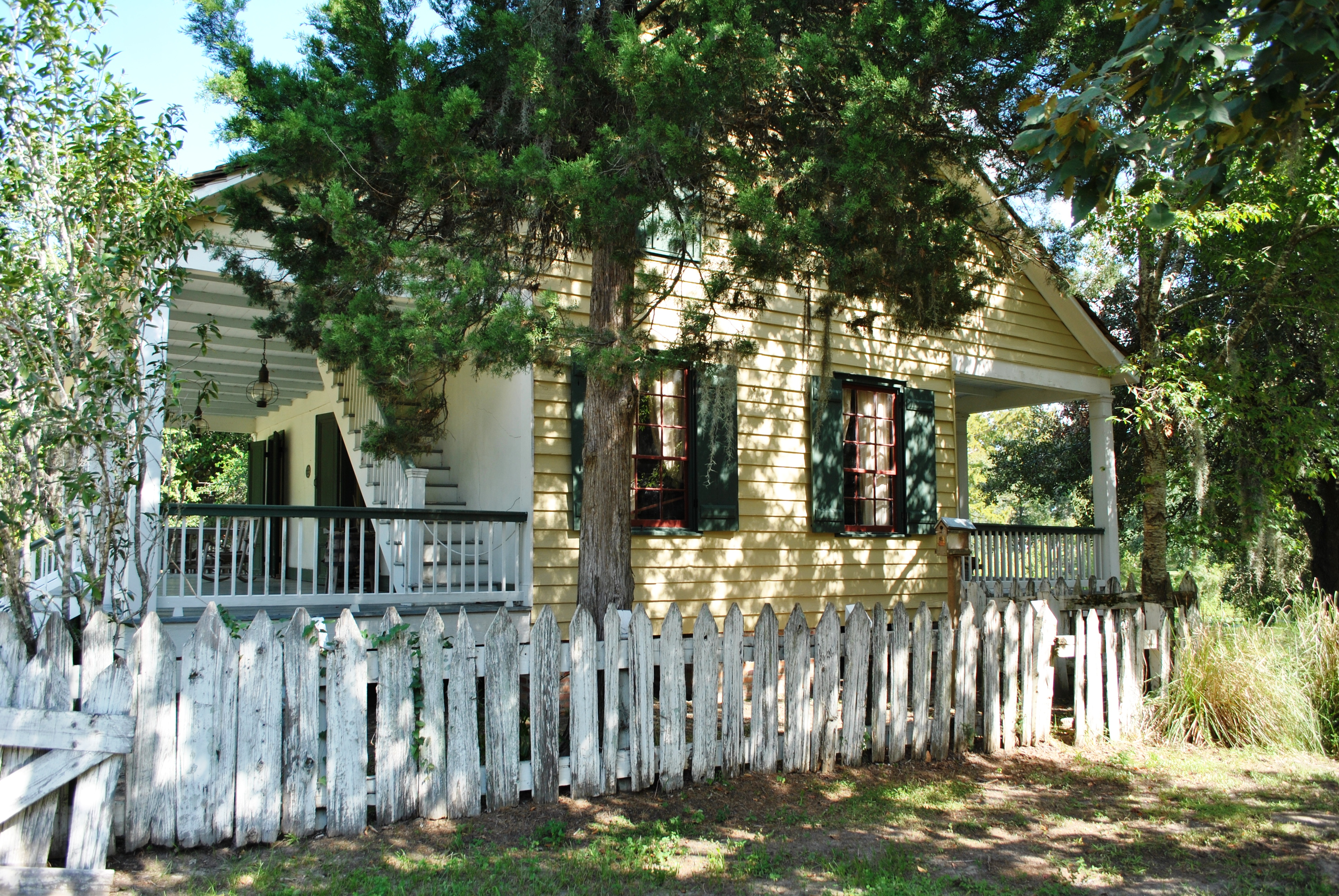
Beau Bassin

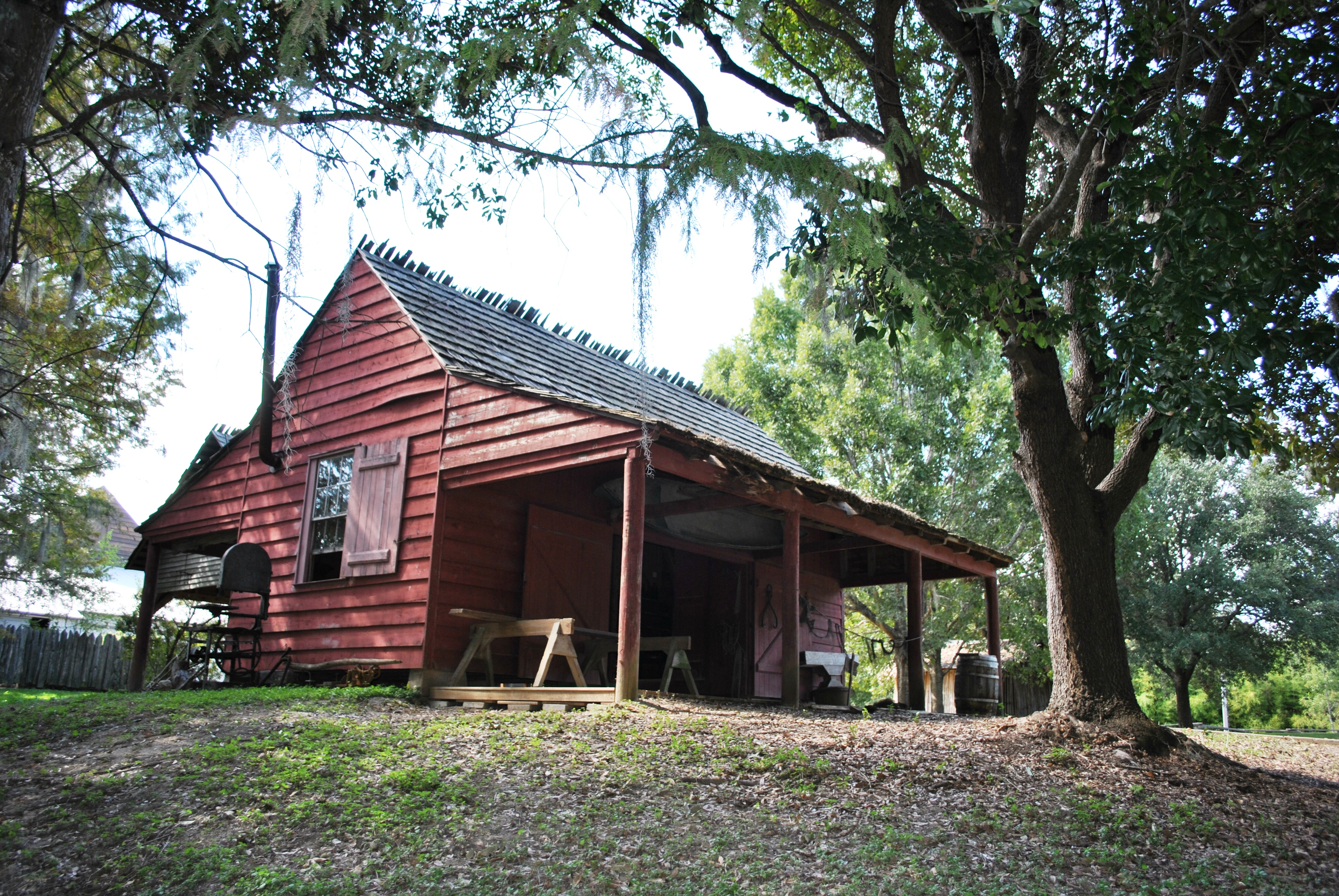
Trapper's Cabin

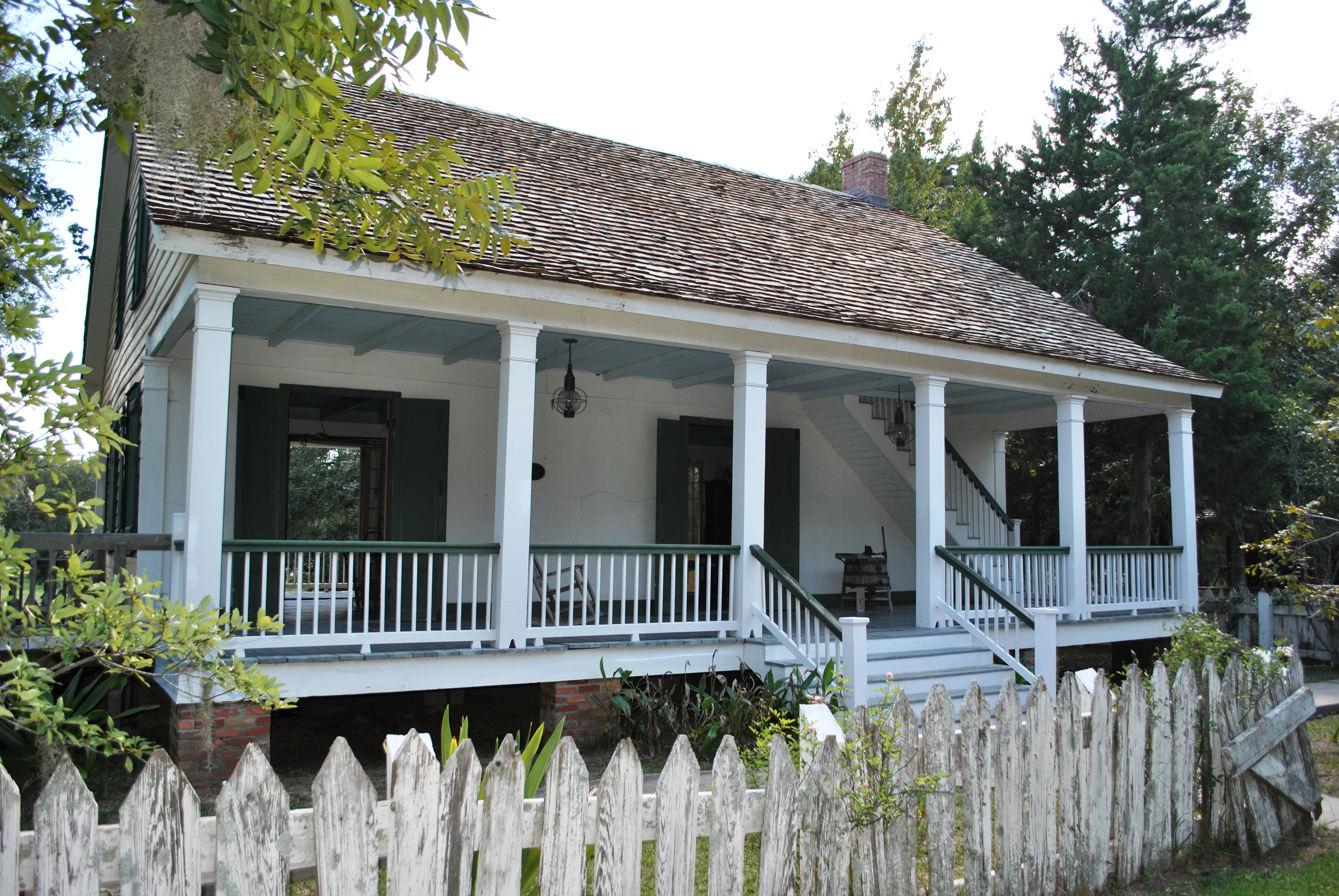
Vermilionville

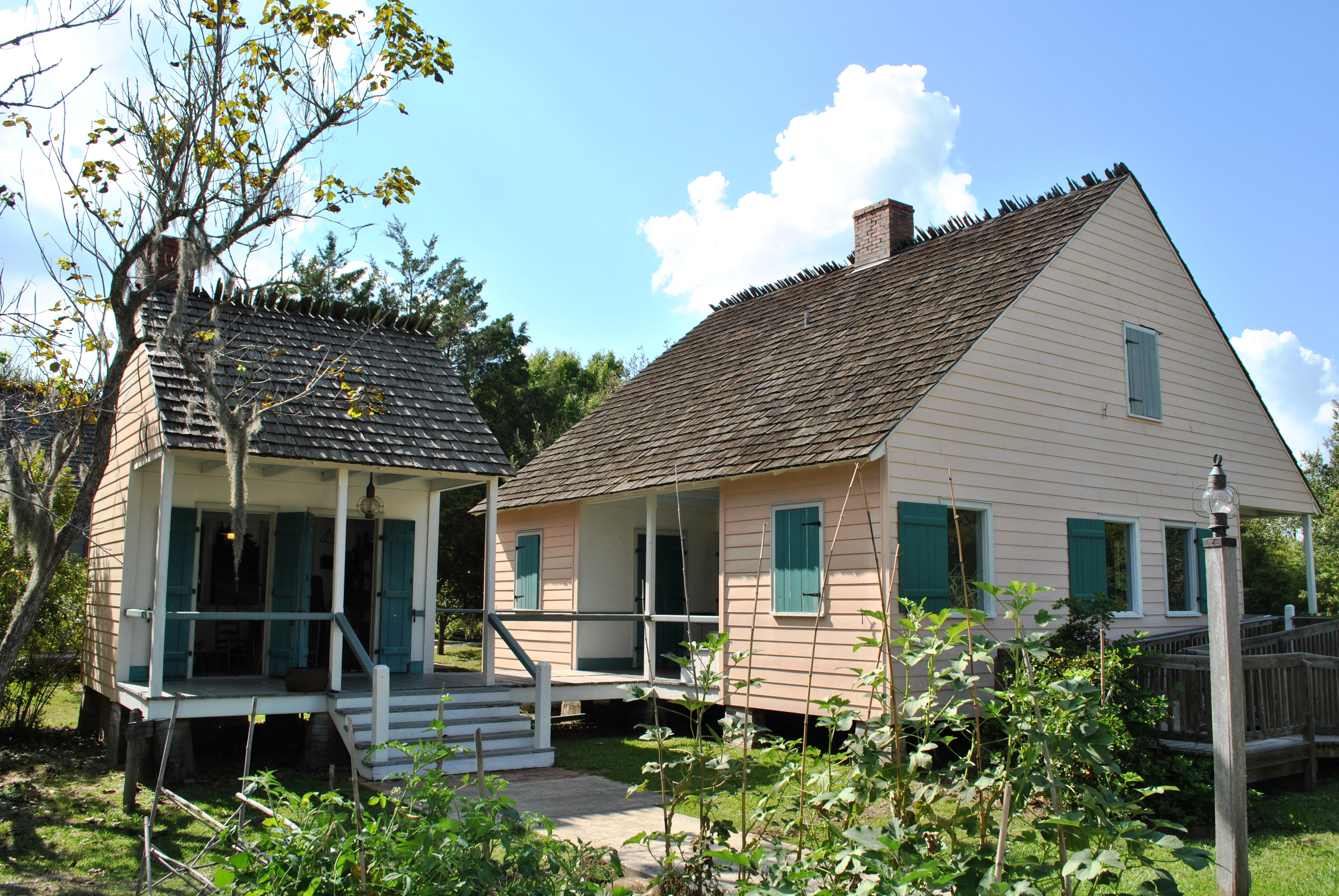
Maison Mouton

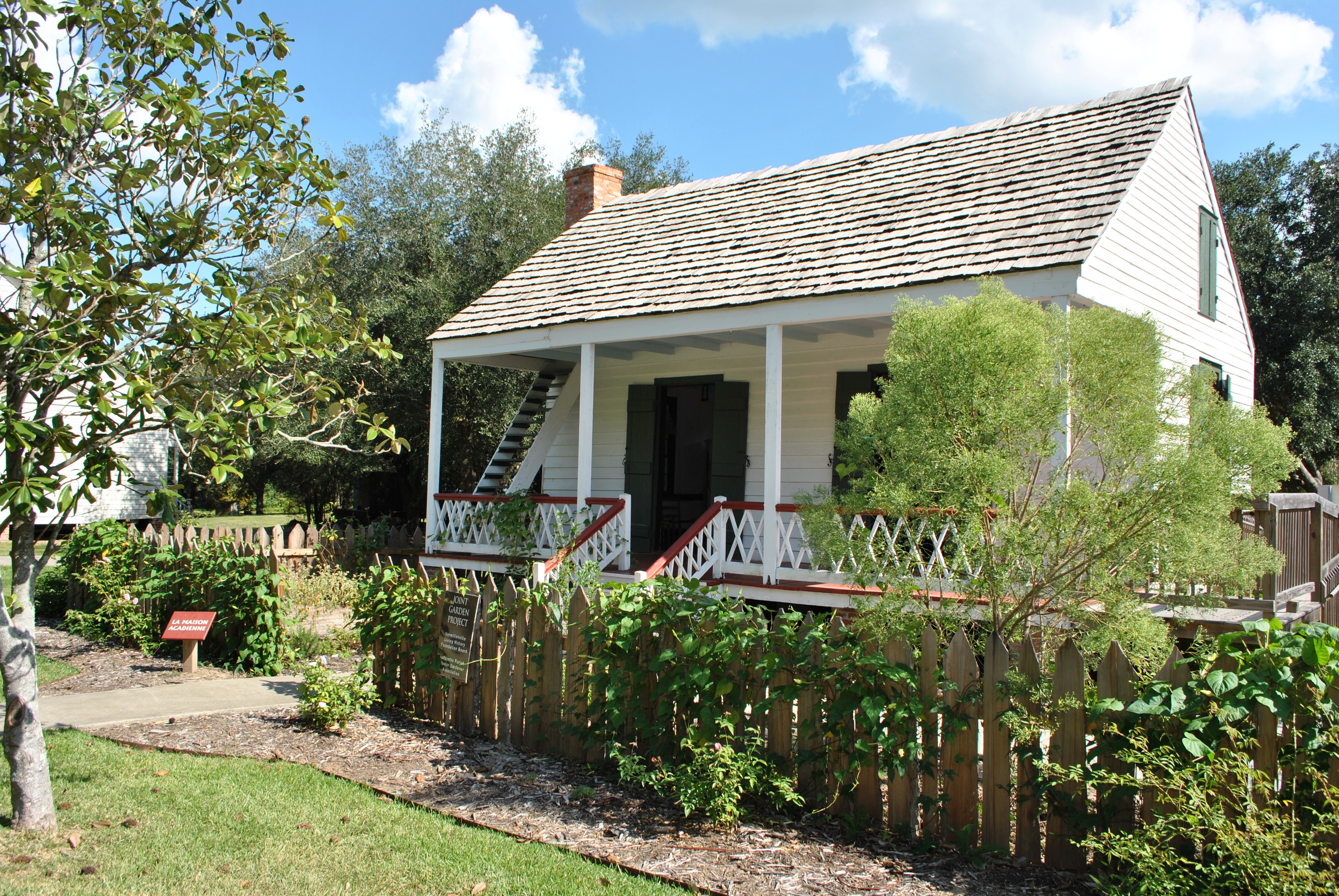
Maison Acadienne

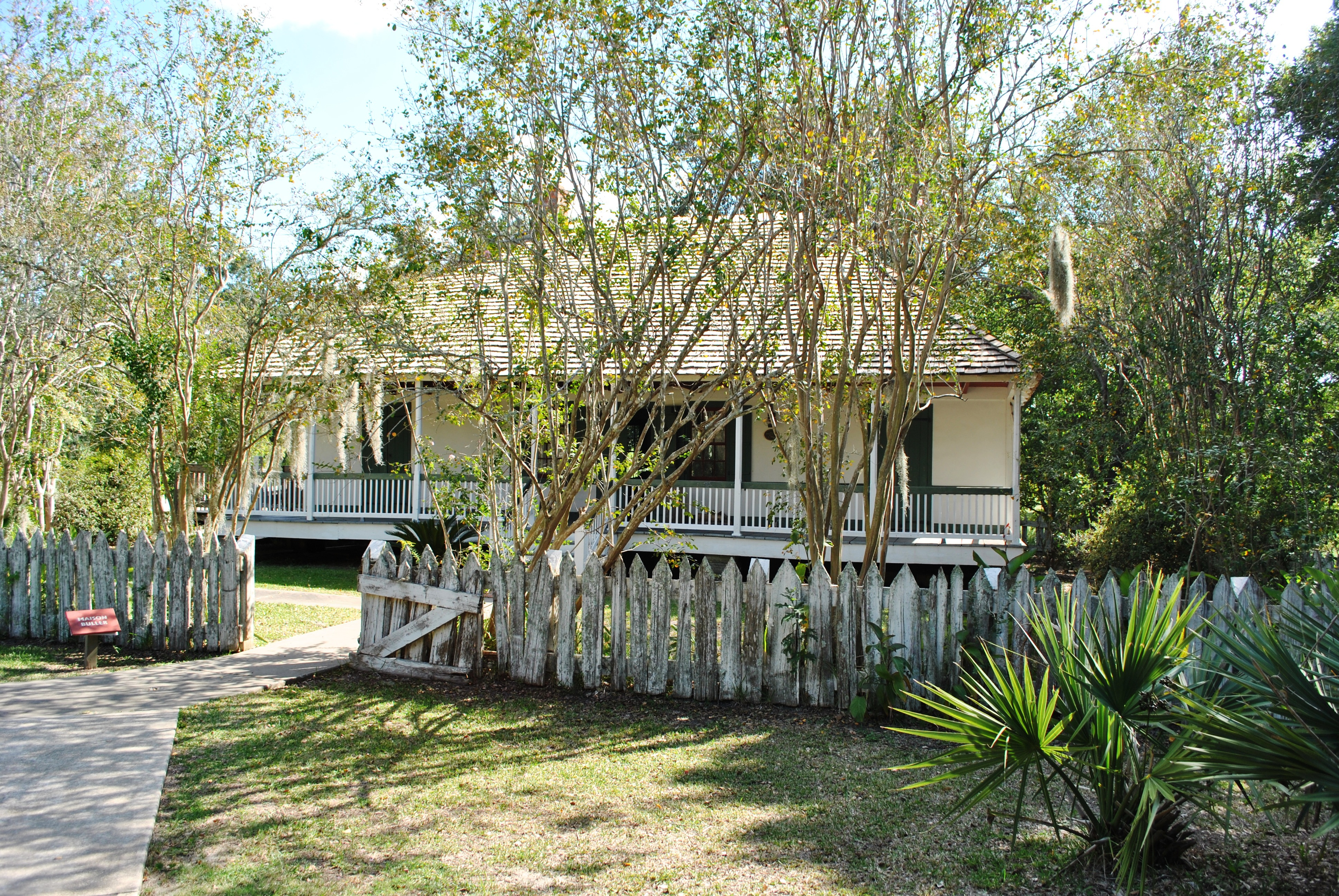
Maison Buller

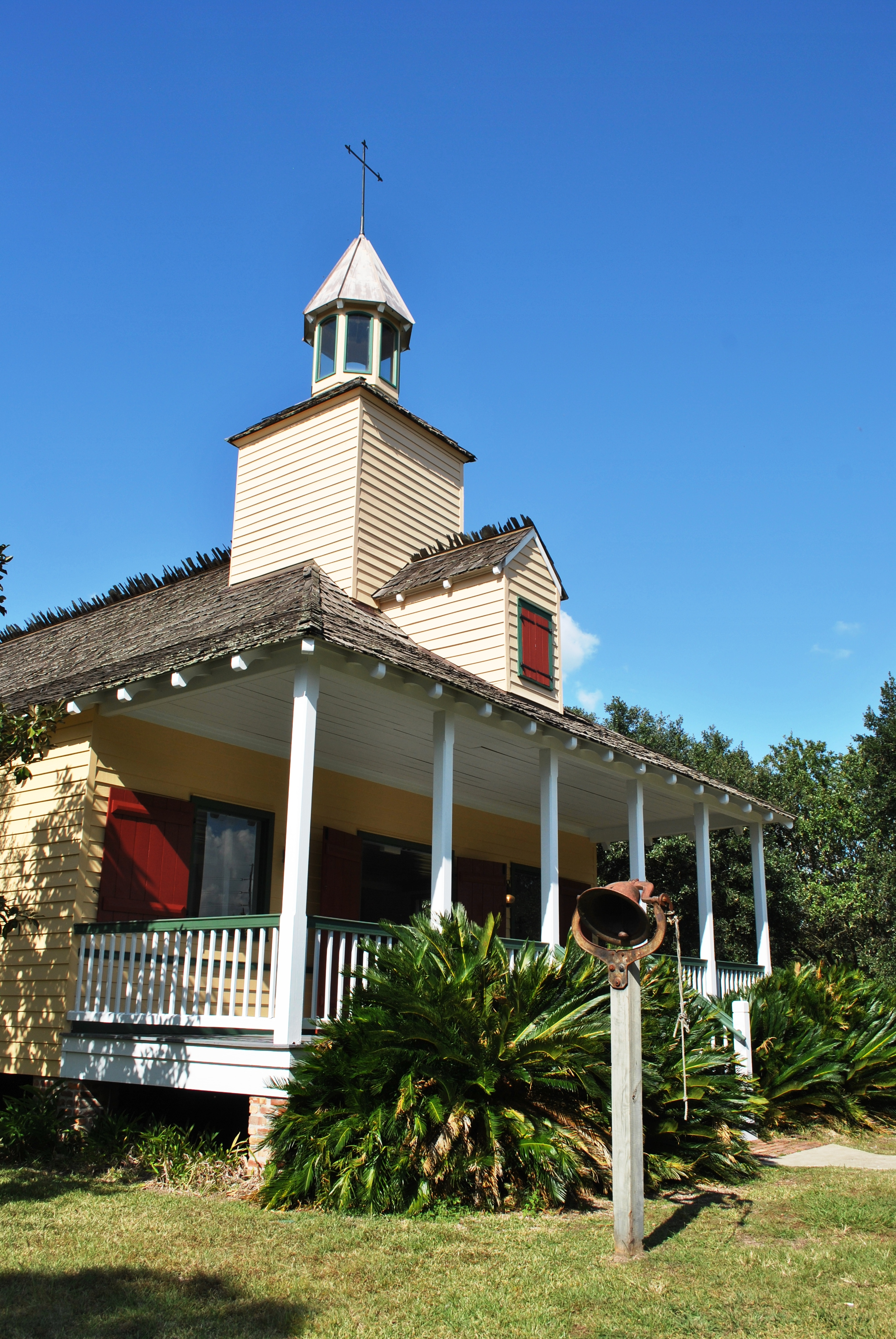
La Chapelle des Attakapas

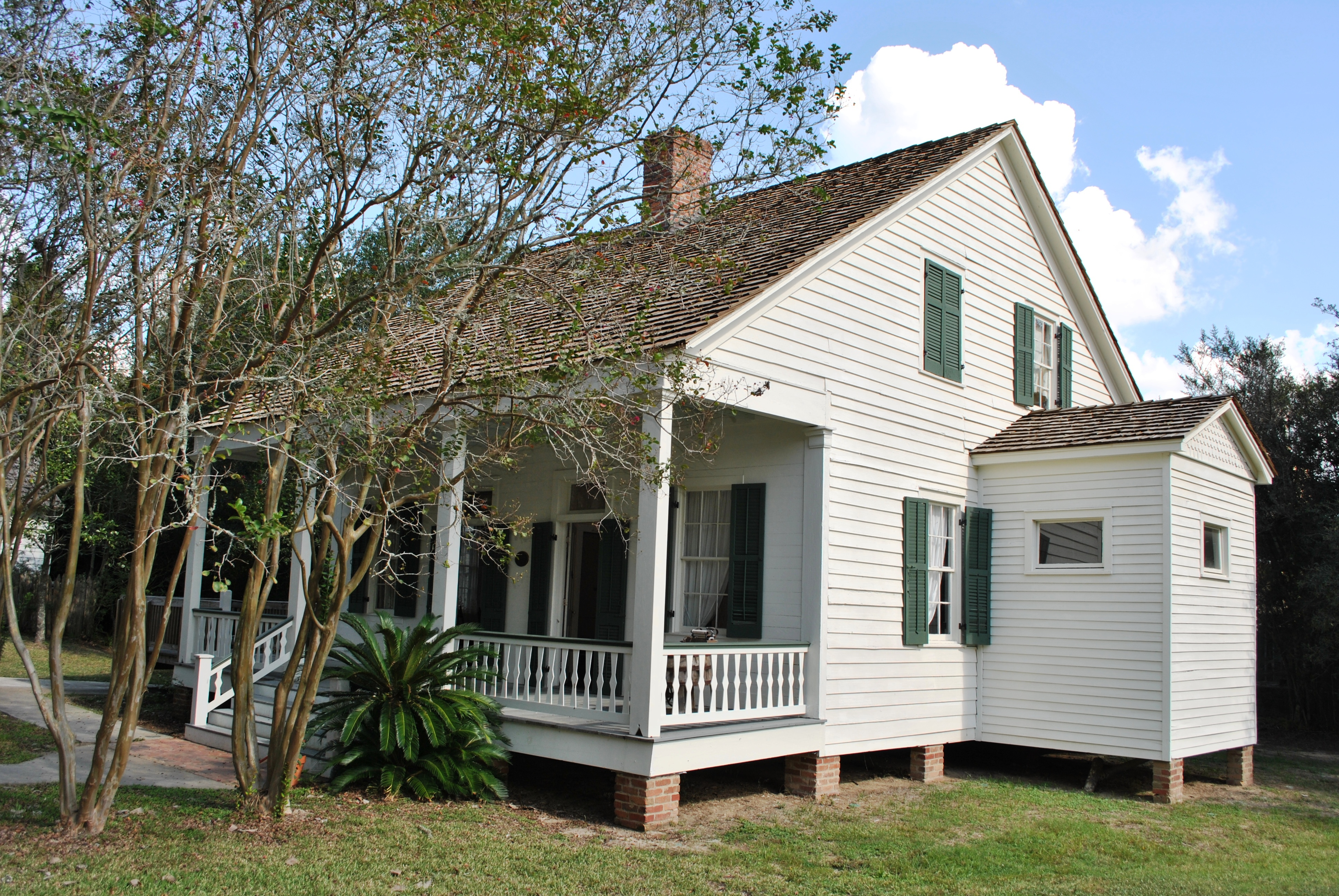
Maison Boucvalt

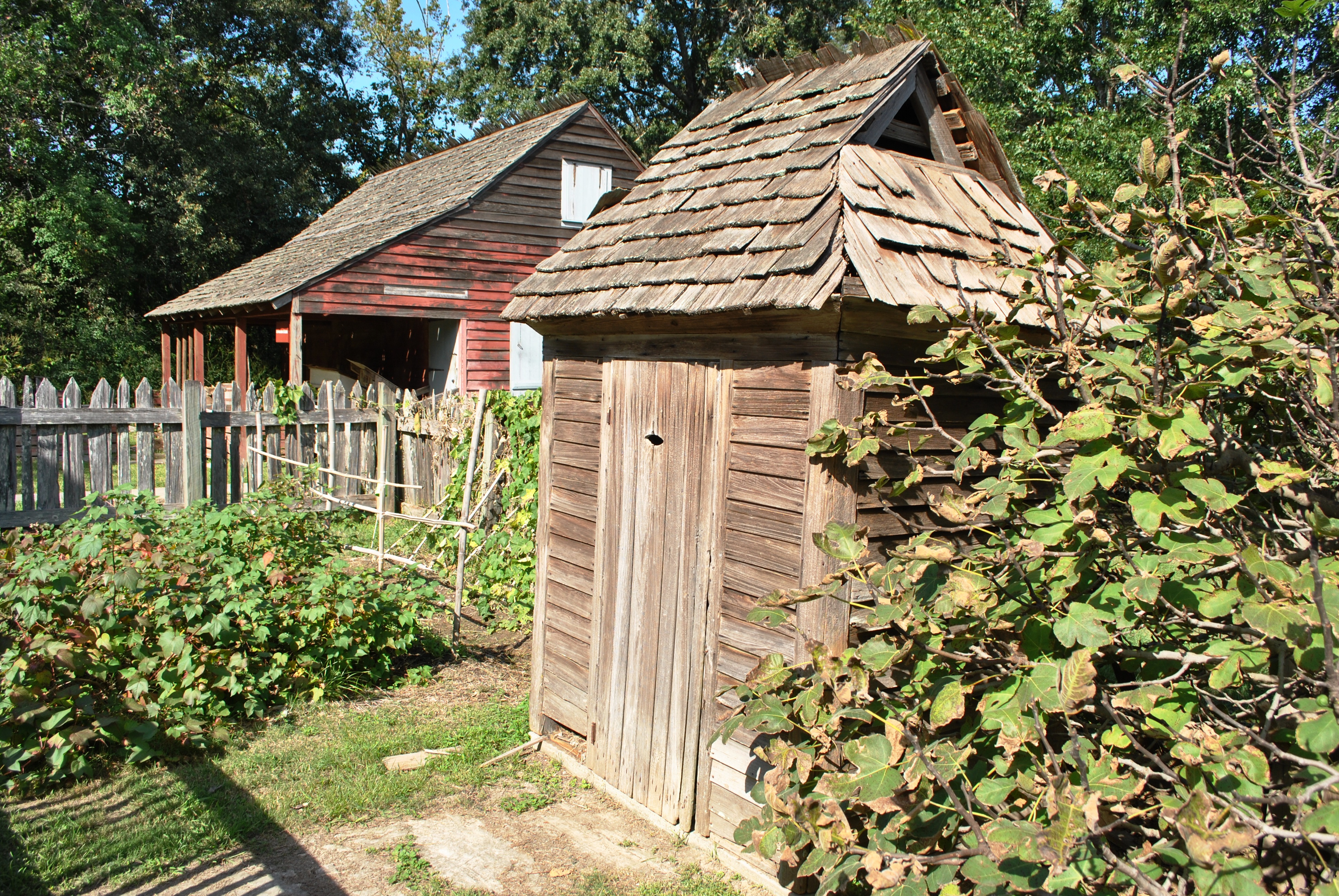
Outhouse near Maison Broussard

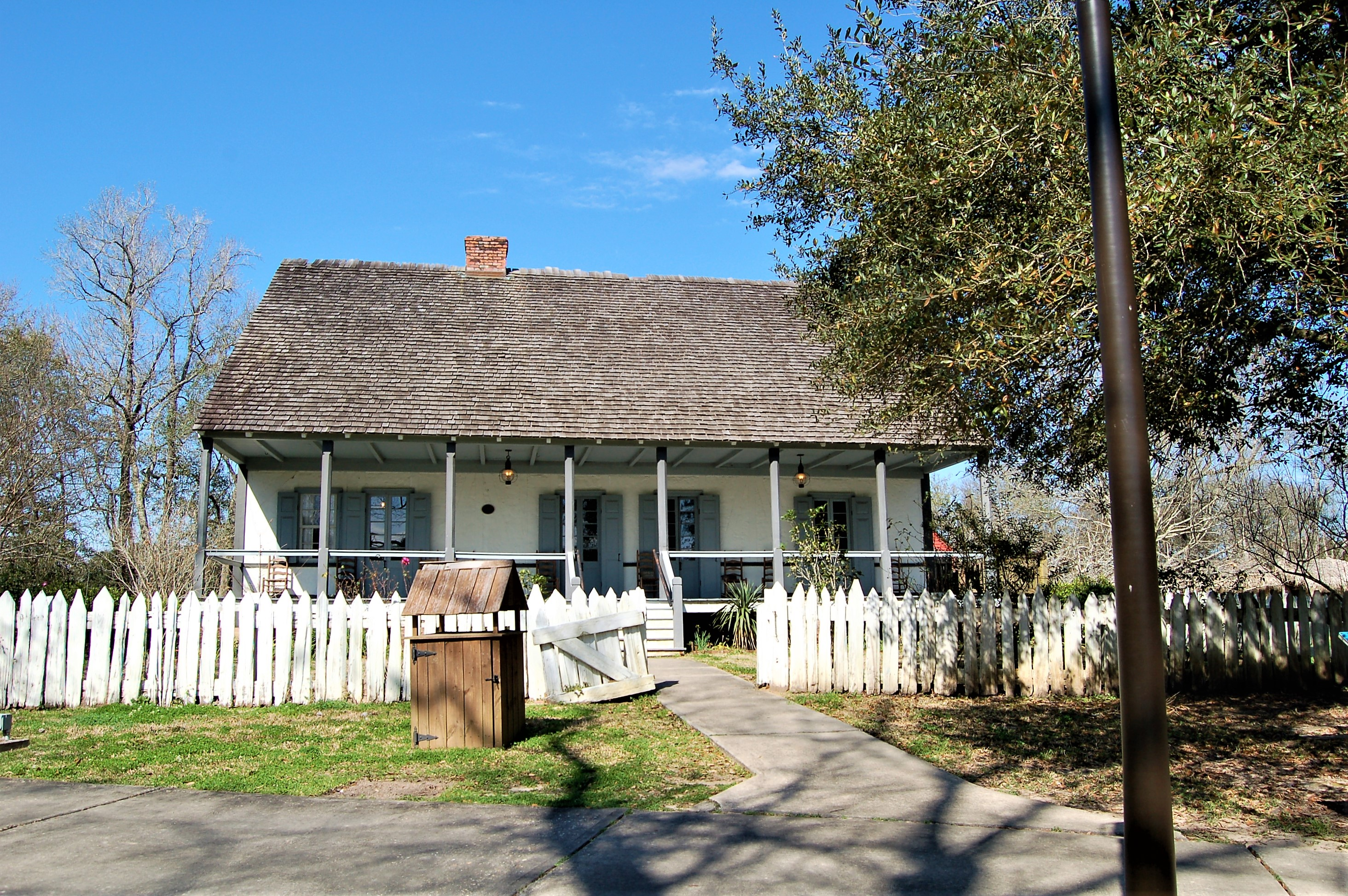
Maison Broussard
