= Old Courthouse Museum – Natchitoches =

Coordinates: 31.7612°N 93.08804°W

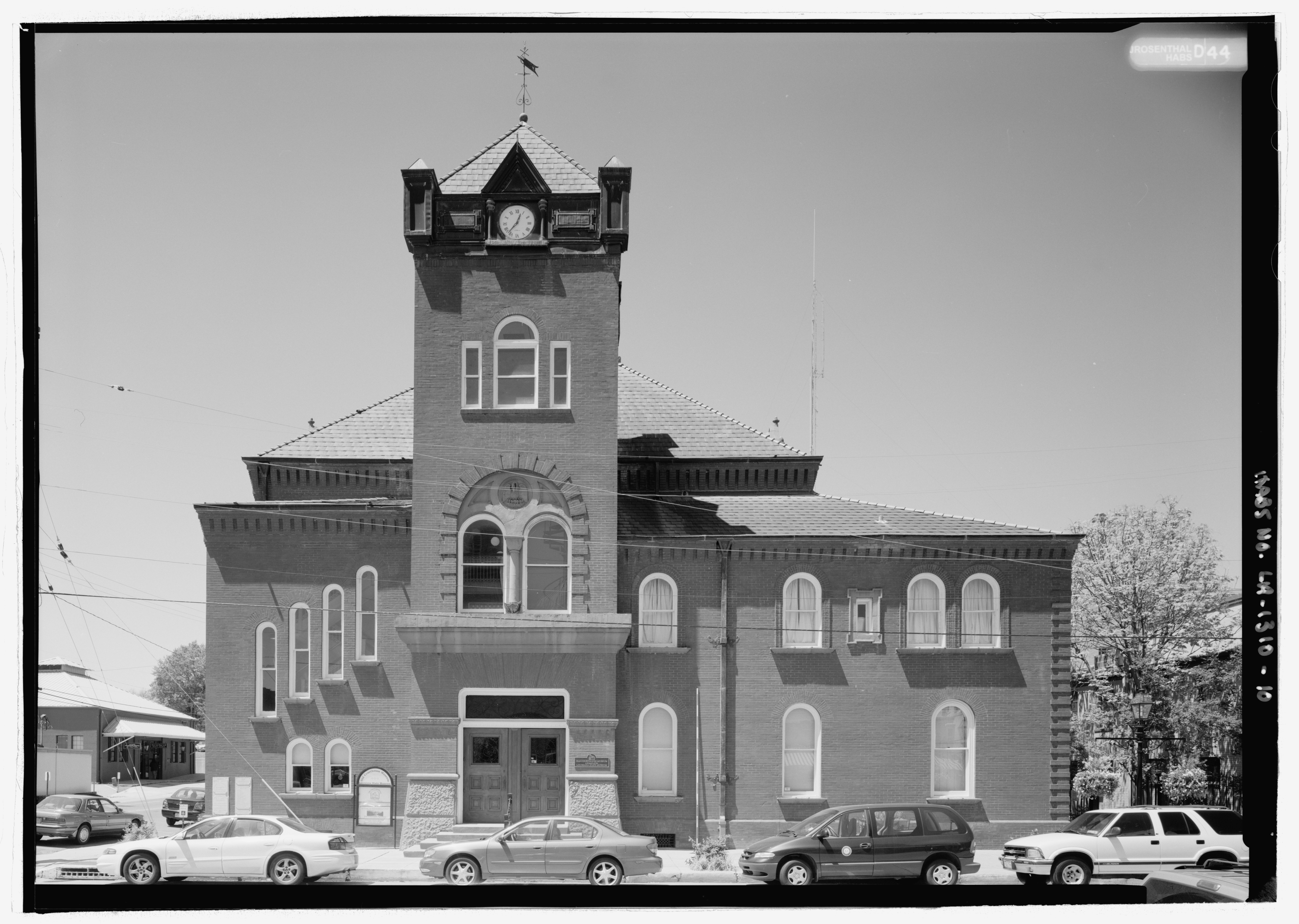
Old Courthouse Museum in Natchitoches.

The Old Courthouse Museum – Natchitoches is a former courthouse is located at 600 Second Street Natchitoches, Louisiana.

The museum was formerly operated as a branch of Louisiana State Museum that displayed temporary exhibits of art and local history. It is no longer open to the public as a museum.

The second floor of the building houses the Natchitoches Genealogy Library, which includes historic maps, conveyances , mortgages and books, census records and other genealogical papers. The library is open to the public.

== Courthouse architecture ==
The courthouse building, built in 1896, designed in the Richardsonian Romanesque style by the architectural firm of Favrot and Livaudais. A brick clock tower rises above the building.

The brick courthouse is a historic district contributing property in the Natchitoches Historic District, of the Cane River National Heritage Area

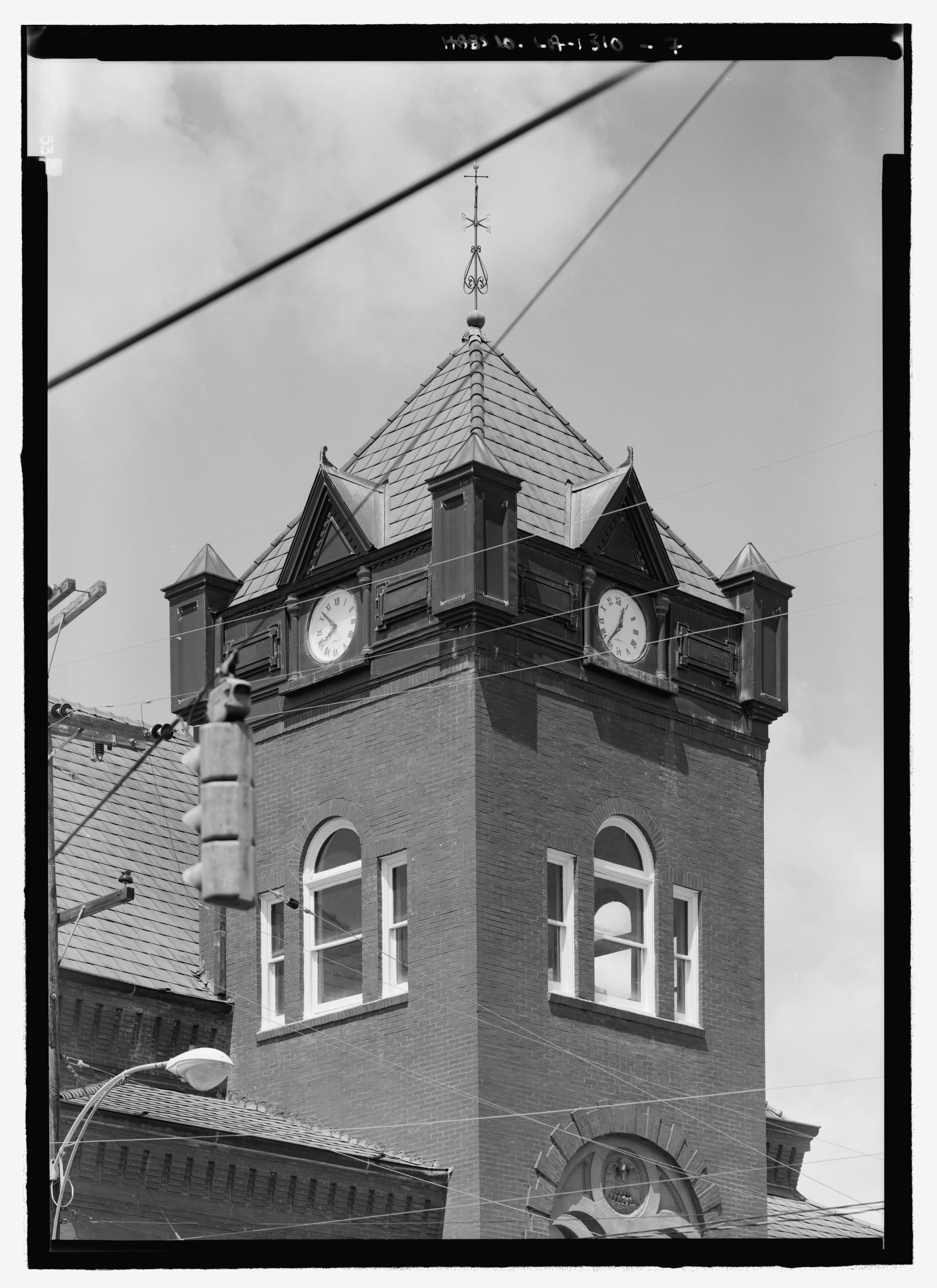
Courthouse clock tower.

== See also ==
- National Register of Historic Places listings in Natchitoches Parish, Louisiana
