= Acadian Village (park) =

Coordinates: 30°10′40″N 92°5′36″W

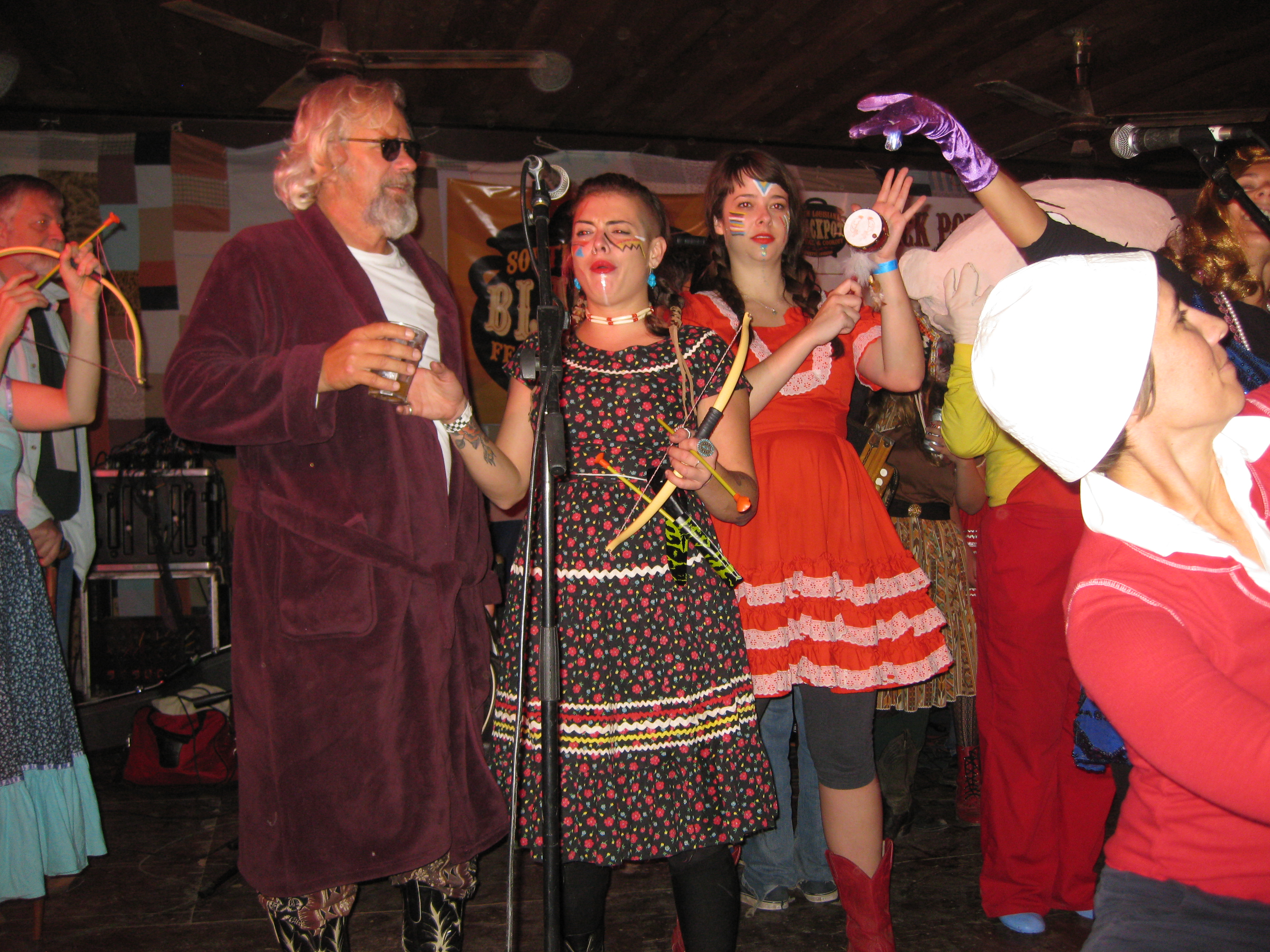
Blackpot festival at Acadian Village, Lafayette, Louisiana

The Acadian Village is a private cultural park located in Lafayette, Louisiana.

== History ==
Acadian Village is located on the 32 acres (130,000 m^{2}) of LARC. In the early 1970s, officials with the facility were looking for an opportunity to improve tourism in Lafayette, Louisiana. However, the idea was to serve a dual purpose: to generate revenue for the facility and to serve as an employment opportunity for those persons with developmental disabilities that were fully capable of working. Dr. Norman Heard, Bob Lowe and Glen Conrad are credited with the idea, which soon after became a reality. The visionary team wanted to use authentic homes. Most of the homes that are on the village grounds had long been abandoned and were being used for hay storage or just not used at all. Families were immediately contacted, and the negotiations began. In some cases, grants were used for the purchase and movement, and in some cases the houses were free – only the cost of moving them was incurred.

In order to recreate a typical 1800s Cajun village, the design team would have to transform 10 acres (40,000 m^{2}) of farmland into a shaded-lived in community with a waterway running through it. The massive undertaking of transforming the property from farm land, dredging of bayous, building paths and footbridges was performed by C Company of the 245th USAR Combat Engineers commanded by Captain Patrick Burke working with Jacques Privat. U.S. Army Reservists Once this was done, local carpenters, businessmen, civic organizations and community volunteers became involved. The end result was a moment captured in time. The 1978 Village Director, Mrs. Marti Gutierrez, said, "the old ways are worth keeping alive, worth handing down, worth remembering."

Seven of the 11 buildings are authentic homes of the 19th century donated by the families whose ancestors once occupied them. All homes show the passing of time and are examples of the ingenuity of the early Acadian homebuilders, complete with wooden pegs, mud walls, hand-hewn cypress timbers and high-peaked roofs. Each was moved piece by piece and carefully restored.

Today, the Acadian Village has served as the backdrop for many Cajun festivals, weddings, special events, corporate functions, Noël Acadien au Village (Christmas lighting program) and the best example of the 19th-century Cajun lifestyle.

== Art Gallery ==
The Art Gallery, as it is known today, was once the private home of Dr. Hypolite Salles, the first resident dentist in Lafayette, Louisiana. He also owned the Doctor's Museum, located next door to the Art Gallery in Acadian Village. Just as it is set up today, is the way the doctor practiced in the late 1890s.

Today, the Art Gallery houses some of the finest examples of southwest Louisiana landscape paintings, stills, florals and much more from Acadian Village resident artists, who can be found throughout regular business hours. Often, the resident artists will be working on original paintings in the Art Gallery. All items in the Art Gallery are original artworks and are for sale.

== Blacksmith ==
There is a replica of a blacksmith shop, built on site with weather-beaten, aged cypress boards. The blacksmith was a very important person in a community; he was the one who made tools, horseshoes, nails, hinges, etc., out of iron.

The anvil, forge and bellows are much like those used long ago. The tongs, pincers, hammers, etc. on the wall are part of the smitty's collection. Also scattered about are tools that have been the mainstay of farmers throughout the years in the southwest prairies.

== The houses ==
The Thibodeaux House was constructed of cypress, the "wood eternal," that is rot and insect resistant. Each pre-cut beam and post was marked with Roman numerals for ease in assembling. The house dates to c. 1820 and came to the village from the Breaux Bridge, Louisiana area. The small rear "cabinet" room, the daughter's room, was accessible only through the parent's room. The boys slept in the attic/loft or garconnier, reached by way of an outside staircase.

Constructed in St. Martinville, Louisiana, the Bernard House is the oldest structure in the village. The section on the left was built first (c. 1800) while that on the right is an addition, (1840). Upon entry into the addition one will see a large painting of the exile of the Acadians from Nova Scotia (Canada) in 1755. The painting in the small rear room depicts their arrival and settling along the bayous of Louisiana in 1764–1765. These paintings were painted by Louisiana artist Robert Dafford and were commissioned by one of the Acadian Village founders, Bob Lowe. The oldest section of the home contains an exhibit on Cajun music. Here, also, is the best example of the type of insulation used within the homes. It is called bousillage entre poteaux (mud between posts).

The Billeaud House comes from the Billeaud Sugar Plantation in Broussard, Louisiana; it was built prior to the Civil War. Today it is used as a spinning and weaving cottage. One of the looms is original to the home and more than 150 years old. The other is a replica, built locally by 72-year-old Mr. Whitney Breaux for the Bicentennial. Homespun blankets and clothes were woven from white cotton, native to Louisiana, and brown cotton introduced from Mexico to the Acadians by the Spaniards.

The Castille House was built for Dorsene Castille (c. 1860) in Breaux Bridge, Louisiana, by a European of whom little is known except that it took him over a year to complete since he did the entire job by himself. During the Civil War the house was pillaged by Yankee soldiers, but somehow survived the ravages of time. The cypress mantels in the home are of interest. Each has a carved emblem on the front. The outside figure looks like a Christian fish and symbolizes a long and happy life; the center emblem looks like a rosette and is called progression. It signifies a large and prosperous family.

Built between 1821 and 1856 near Youngsville, Louisiana, the LeBlanc house is the birthplace of Acadian Senator Dudley J. LeBlanc. Cajun politician and entrepreneur Dudley J. "Couzin Dud" LeBlanc was born on August 16, 1894. He attended Southwestern Louisiana Institute, and during World War I served as a sergeant in the U.S. Army. In 1924 LeBlanc was elected a member of the Louisiana House of Representatives, and in 1926 became Public Service Commissioner. He served as state senator from 1940 to 1944, 1948 to 1952, and in 1964.

The St. John house dates to c. 1840 and was donated to the village by a local dentist. It was located on St. John Street near downtown Lafayette – thus its name. It was built of salvaged cypress timbers from another building. The house is currently being used as a schoolhouse. Among the desks is a three-seater which came to the village from an old schoolhouse near Sunset, Louisiana. Old books, inkwells, lunch pails and the wooden stove round out the exhibit.

== Noël Acadien au Village ==
Acadian Village comes alive the first three weeks of December for Noël Acadien au Village. Entertainment includes area musicians, choirs, choruses, bands and much more. Every night kids of all ages can have their photo taken with Santa – and receive it on the spot for a nominal charge.

Christmas Depot, the New Orleans Company responsible for lighting the entire village, said that it takes 10–12 people or nearly 2,000 hours of work to complete the job. Tim Fitzpatrick of Christmas Depot begins strategizing for the massive undertaking in September. They return in October and November to light the village. By mid-November, the job is essentially done.

== See also ==
- Acadiana
- Vermilionville Historic Village
