= Bonnie & Clyde Ambush Museum =

Museum in Louisiana, United States

Coordinates: 32°32′41″N 93°03′12″W

The Bonnie & Clyde Ambush Museum is a museum located in Gibsland, Louisiana at 2419 Main Street, the former site of Ma Canfield's Cafe where Bonnie and Clyde stopped at to purchase sandwiches before dying in an ambush led by Texas Ranger Frank Hamer 7 miles away on May 23, 1934. The museum has been open since 2005 and features a "Death Car", similar to the vehicle in which the duo was killed. The actual car is owned by The Primm Valley Resort & Casino in Primm, Nevada.

The Bonnie & Clyde Ambush Museum had on display in its early years the vehicle used in the 1967 Warren Beatty and Faye Dunaway film, Bonnie and Clyde which was eventually sold to the Alcatraz East museum in Tennessee. The museum also has several personal effects of Barrow and Parker including clothes, personal possessions and other Bonnie and Clyde related memorabilia.
