= Charles H. Mouton House =

Historic house in Louisiana, United States

- U.S. National Register of Historic Places
- U.S. Historic district – Contributing property
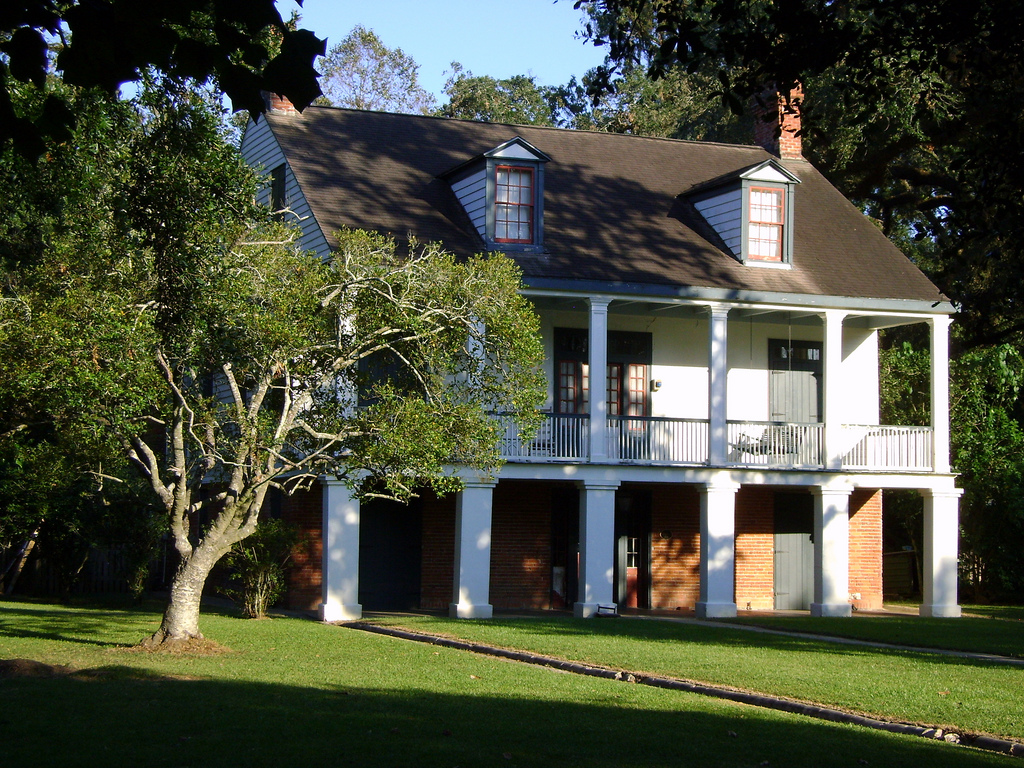

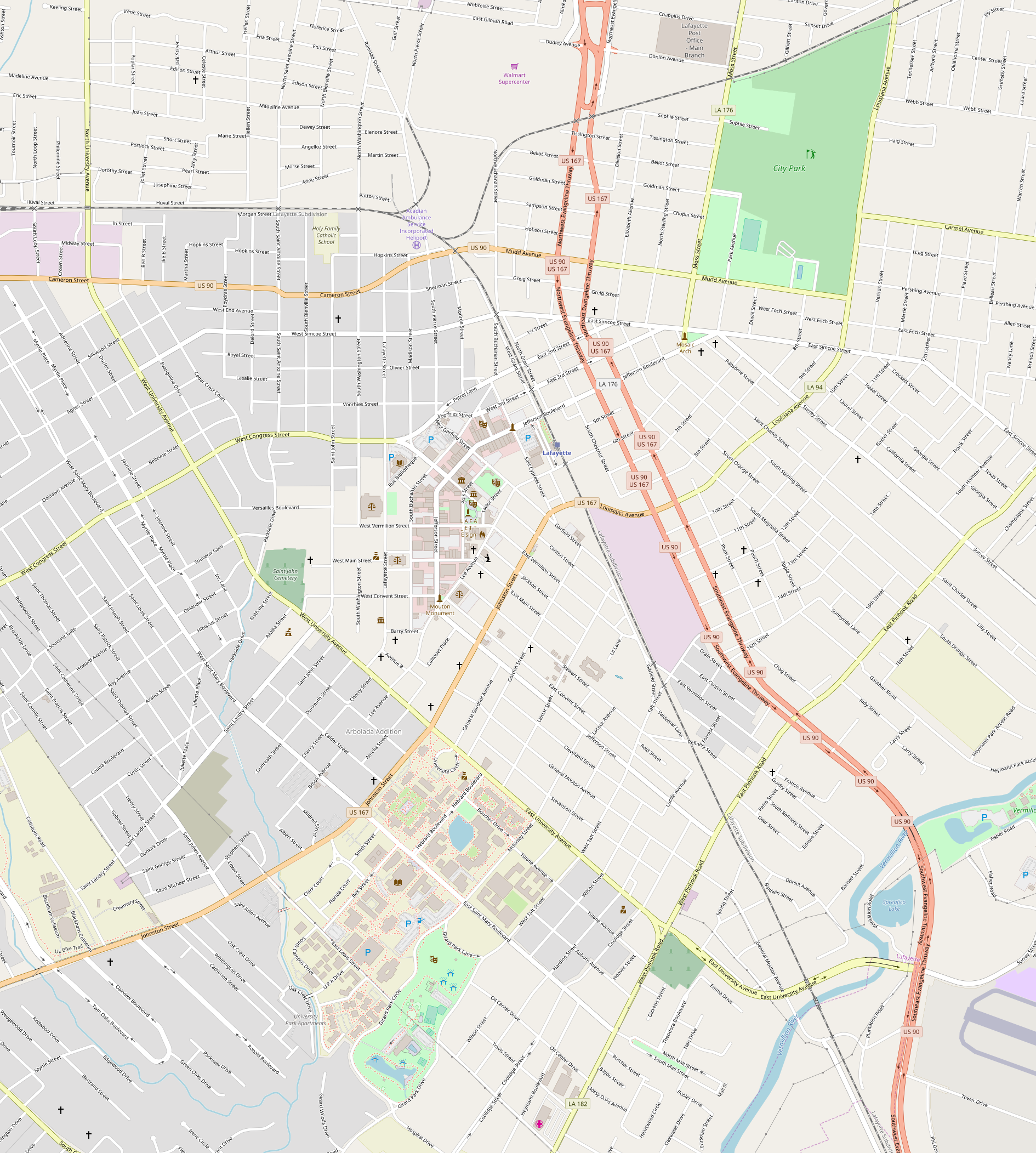
- Location within Lafayette
- Location: 338 North Sterling Street, Lafayette, Louisiana
- Coordinates: 30°13′56″N 92°00′36″W
- Area: 1.75 acres (0.71 ha)
- Built: 1848
- Built by: Charles H. Mouton
- Architectural style: Greek Revival
- Part of: Sterling Grove Historic District (ID84001320)
- NRHP reference No.: 80001735

Significant dates
- Added to NRHP: June 9, 1980
- Designated CP: July 26, 1984

The Charles H. Mouton House, also known as Shady Oaks, is a historic house located at 338 North Sterling Street in Lafayette, Louisiana, United States.

Built in 1848 as the residence of Charles Homere Mouton, the house is a two-and-one-half story Greek Revival building with a front gallery with Doric posts, a brick ground floor, a frame second floor and pitched roof.

The house was listed on the National Register of Historic Places on June 9, 1980. It was also added as a contributing property to the Sterling Grove Historic District at the time of its creation, on July 26, 1984.

== See also ==
- National Register of Historic Places listings in Lafayette Parish, Louisiana
- Sterling Grove Historic District
