= Sterling Grove Historic District =

Historic district in Louisiana, United States

- U.S. National Register of Historic Places
- U.S. Historic district
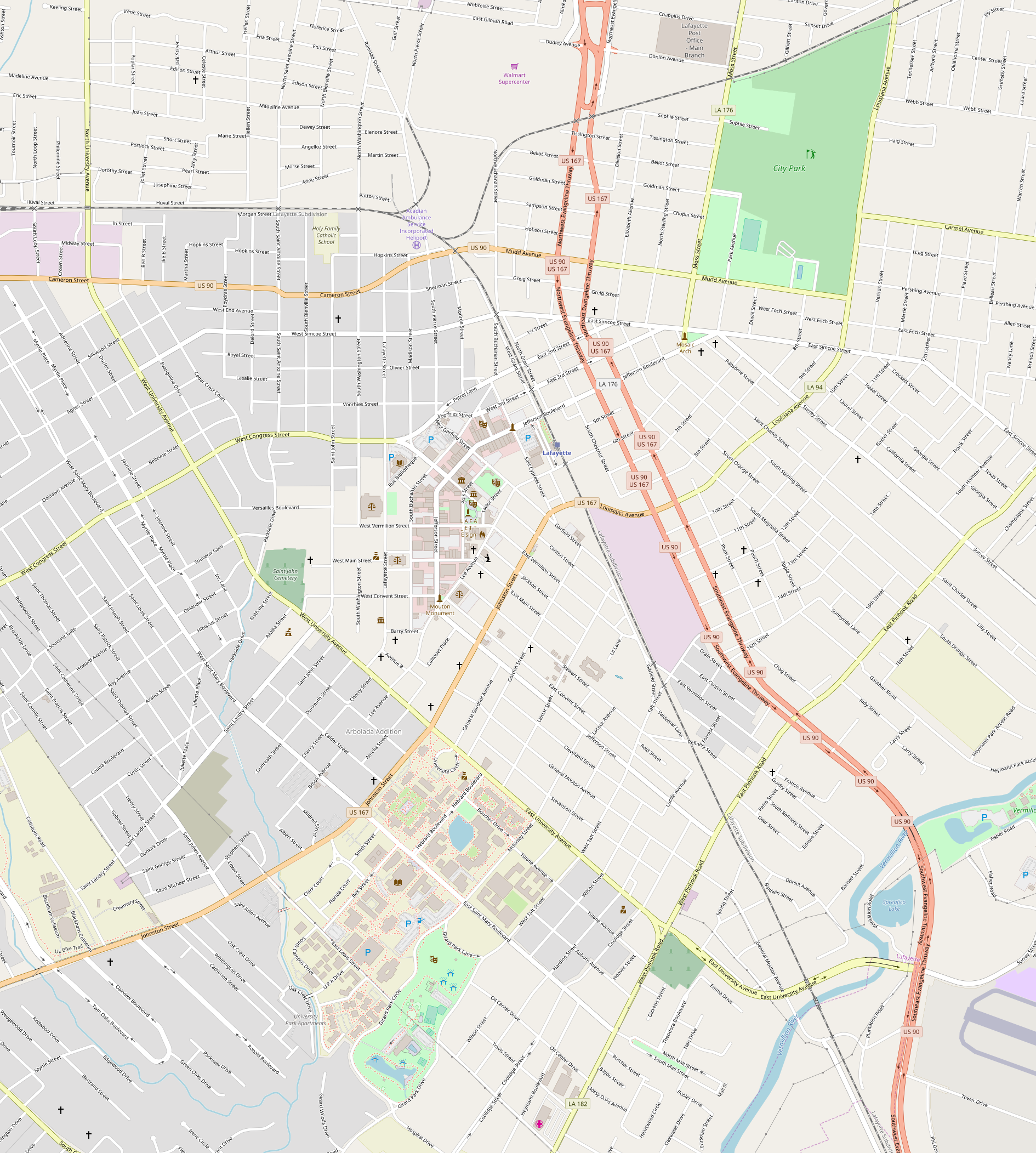
- Location within Lafayette

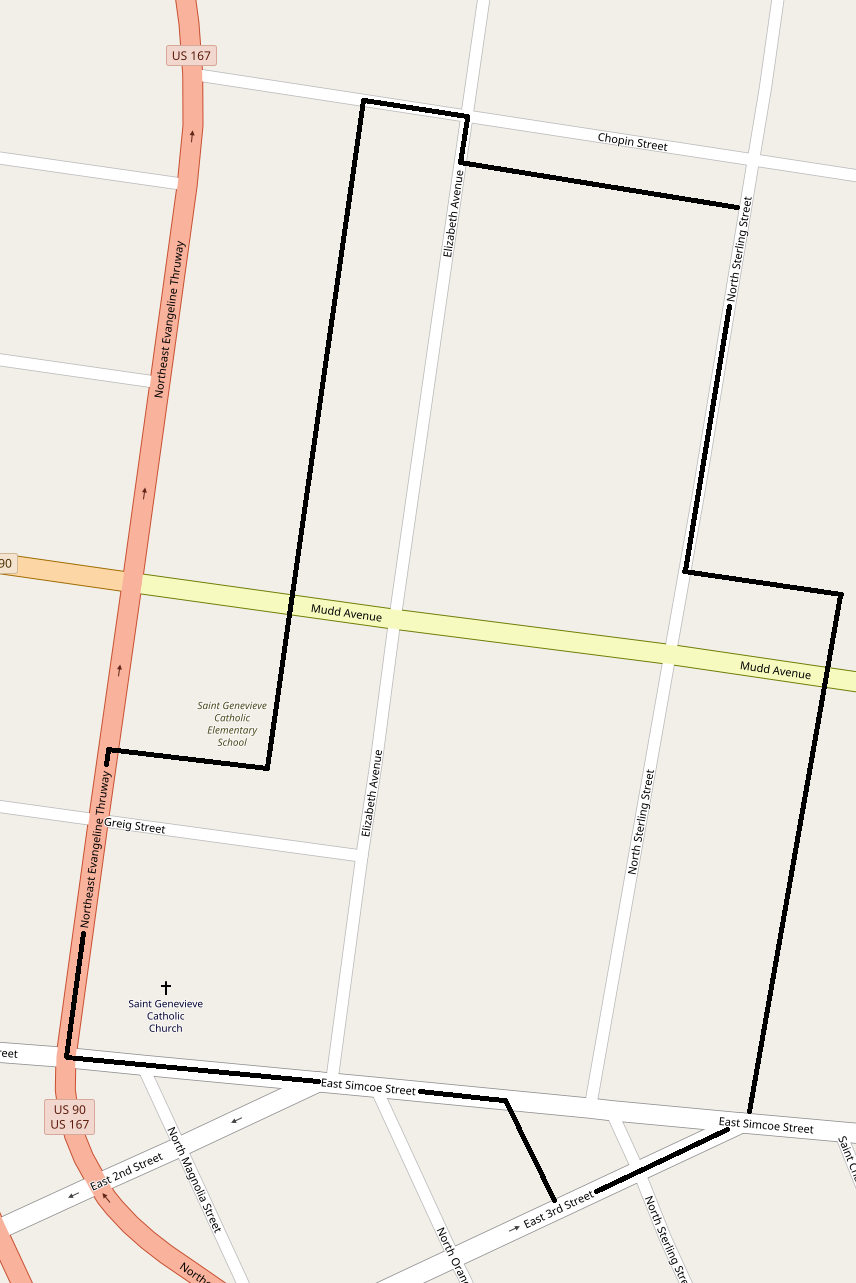
- Location: Roughly bounded by Evangeline Throughway, East Simcoe Street, North Sterling Street and Chopin Street, Lafayette, Louisiana
- Coordinates: 30°13′58″N 92°00′39″W
- Area: 25 acres (10 ha)
- NRHP reference No.: 84001320
- Added to NRHP: July 26, 1984

Sterling Grove Historic District is a historic district in downtown Lafayette, Louisiana, United States, roughly bounded by Evangeline Throughway, East Simcoe Street, North Sterling Street and Chopin Street.

The 25-acre (10 ha) area comprises a total of 59 buildings, of which 43 are considered contributing properties, and one is also listed on the National Register of Historic Places as individual property. Building dates vary from 1848 to 1934 and are mostly residences. The district comprises the area of Lieutenant Governor Charles Mouton's plantation.

The historic district was listed on the National Register of Historic Places on July 26, 1984.

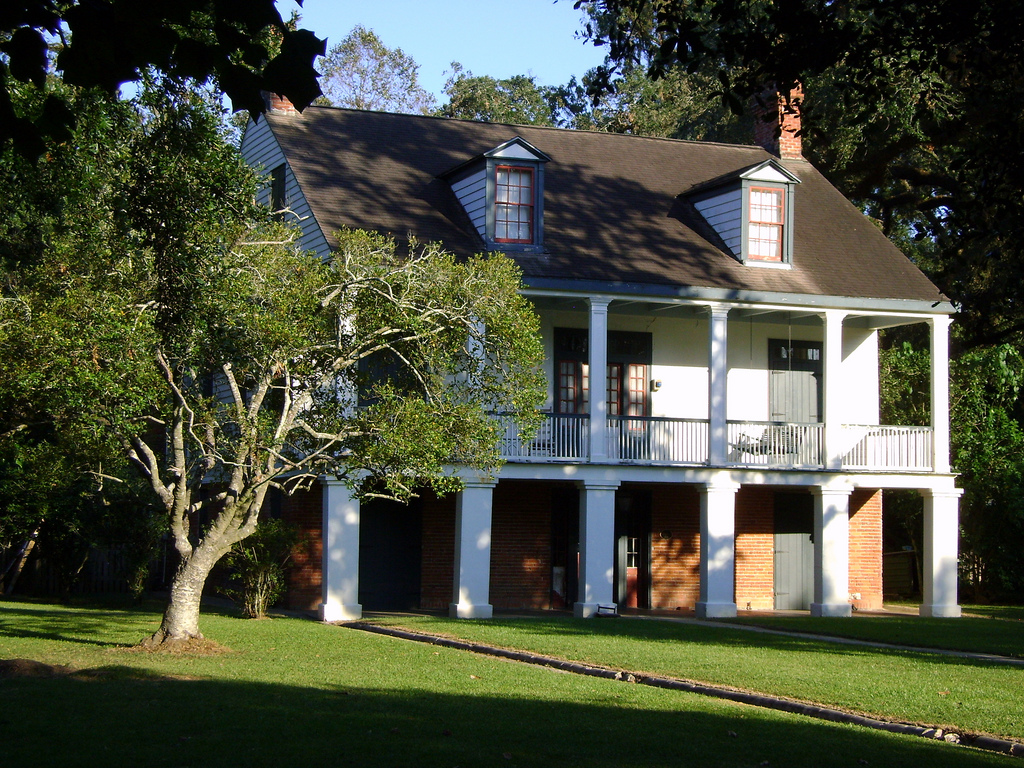
Charles H. Mouton House at 338 North Sterling Street

== Contributing properties ==
The historical district contains a total of 43 contributing properties, built between 1848 and 1934:

- House at 310 North Sterling Street, 30°13′52″N 92°00′37″W, built c.1890.
- House at 318 North Sterling Street, 30°13′53″N 92°00′37″W, built c.1900.
- House at 324 North Sterling Street, 30°13′54″N 92°00′36″W, built 1893.
- House at 330 North Sterling Street, 30°13′55″N 92°00′36″W, built c.1925.
- Charles H. Mouton House, at 338 North Sterling Street, 30°13′56″N 92°00′36″W, built 1848. Also individually listed.
- House at 406 North Sterling Street, 30°13′58″N 92°00′35″W, built c.1915.
- House at 515 East 3rd Street, 30°13′50″N 92°00′39″W, built c.1890.
- House at 319 North Sterling Street, 30°13′54″N 92°00′39″W, built c.1910.
- House at 323 North Sterling Street, 30°13′55″N 92°00′39″W, built c.1925.
- House at 333 North Sterling Street, 30°13′56″N 92°00′39″W, built c.1900.
- House at 339 North Sterling Street, 30°13′56″N 92°00′38″W, built c.1925.
- House at 345 North Sterling Street, 30°13′57″N 92°00′38″W, built c.1930.
- House at 411 North Sterling Street, 30°13′59″N 92°00′38″W, built c.1900.
- House at 427 North Sterling Street, 30°14′01″N 92°00′37″W, built c.1927.
- House at 435 North Sterling Street, 30°14′02″N 92°00′37″W, built 1905.
- House at 443 North Sterling Street, 30°14′04″N 92°00′37″W, built 1903.
- House at 449 North Sterling Street, 30°14′04″N 92°00′37″W, built 1899.
- House at 336 Elizabeth Avenue, 30°14′03″N 92°00′40″W, built 1902.
- House at 328 Elizabeth Avenue, 30°14′02″N 92°00′40″W, built 1931.
- House at 603 Mudd Avenue, 30°13′59″N 92°00′41″W, built c.1900.
- House at 615 Mudd Avenue, 30°13′59″N 92°00′39″W, built c.1930.
- House at 220 Elizabeth Avenue, 30°13′58″N 92°00′41″W, built 1915.
- House at 214 Elizabeth Avenue, 30°13′57″N 92°00′41″W, built c.1910.
- House at 204 Elizabeth Avenue, 30°13′55″N 92°00′41″W, built c.1925.
- House at 124 Elizabeth Avenue, 30°13′55″N 92°00′41″W, built 1905.
- House at 116 Elizabeth Avenue, 30°13′54″N 92°00′41″W, built c.1930.
- House at 110 Elizabeth Avenue, 30°13′53″N 92°00′42″W, built c.1900.
- Saint Genevieve Church, 417 East Simcoe Street, 30°13′52″N 92°00′46″W, built c.1925.
- Parish Hall, Northeast Evangeline Throughway, 30°13′54″N 92°00′46″W, built c.1930. No more standing.
- House at 113 Elizabeth Avenue, 30°13′54″N 92°00′43″W, built c.1930. No more standing.
- House at 117 Elizabeth Avenue, 30°13′54″N 92°00′43″W, built 1902. No more standing.
- House at 503 Greig Street, 30°13′56″N 92°00′46″W, built 1906. No more standing.
- House at 515 Greig Street, 30°13′56″N 92°00′45″W, built c.1930.
- House at 521 Greig Street, 30°13′56″N 92°00′43″W, built 1903. No more standing.
- House at 221 Elizabeth Avenue, 30°13′58″N 92°00′42″W, built 1915.
- House at 309 Elizabeth Avenue, 30°14′00″N 92°00′42″W, built 1921.
- House at 313 Elizabeth Avenue, 30°14′00″N 92°00′42″W, built c.1930.
- House at 321 Elizabeth Avenue, 30°14′01″N 92°00′42″W, built 1906.
- House at 327 Elizabeth Avenue, 30°14′02″N 92°00′42″W, built 1931.
- House at 331 Elizabeth Avenue, 30°14′02″N 92°00′42″W, built 1934.
- House at 343 Elizabeth Avenue, 30°14′04″N 92°00′41″W, built c.1930.
- House at 347 Elizabeth Avenue, 30°14′04″N 92°00′41″W, built c.1920.
- House at 351 Elizabeth Avenue, 30°14′05″N 92°00′41″W, built 1904.

== See also ==
- National Register of Historic Places listings in Lafayette Parish, Louisiana
- Charles H. Mouton House
