= Baton Rouge, Louisiana =

Capital city of Louisiana, United States

Baton Rouge Bâton-Rouge (French) Batonrouj (Louisiana Creole)
- State capital city and consolidated city-parish
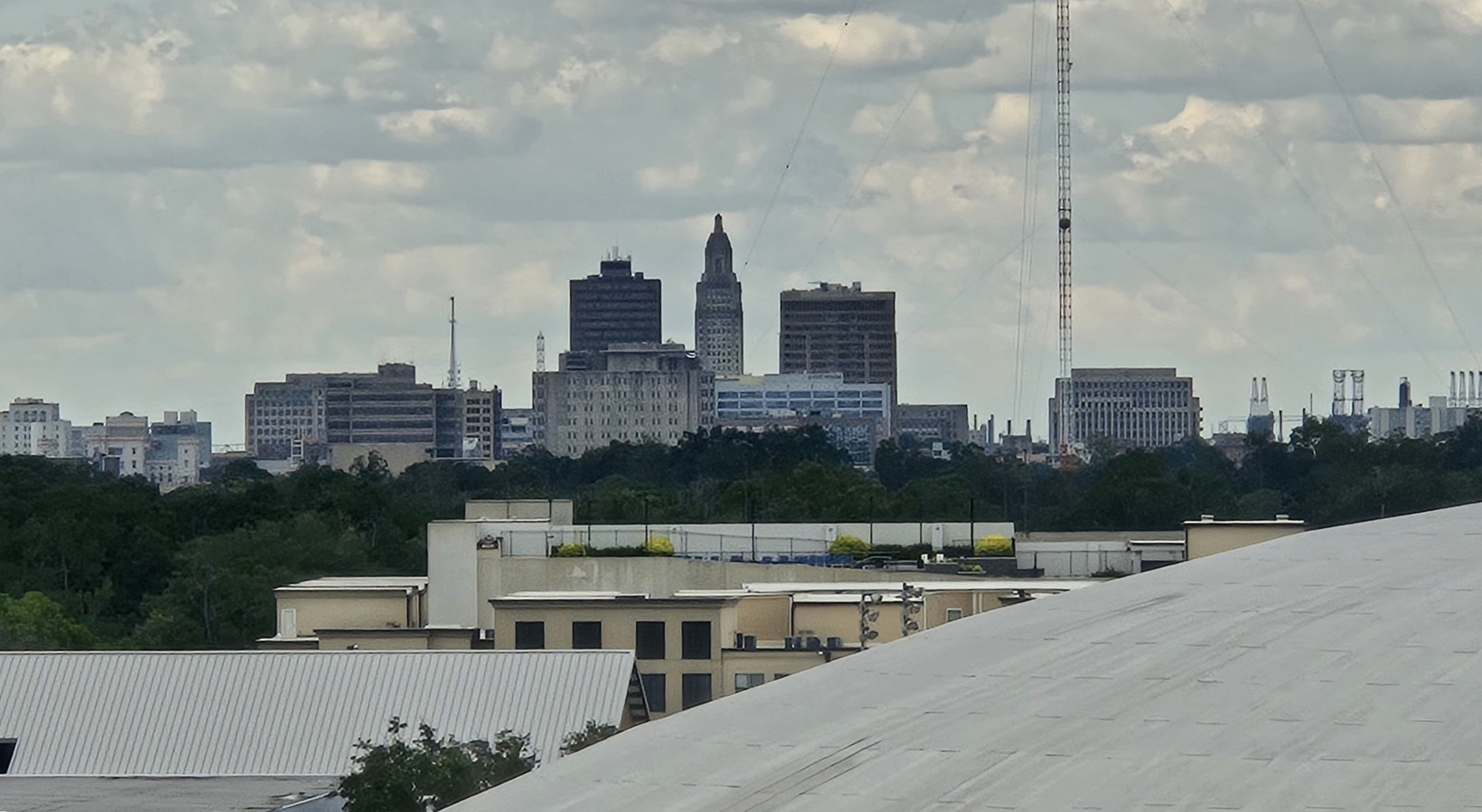
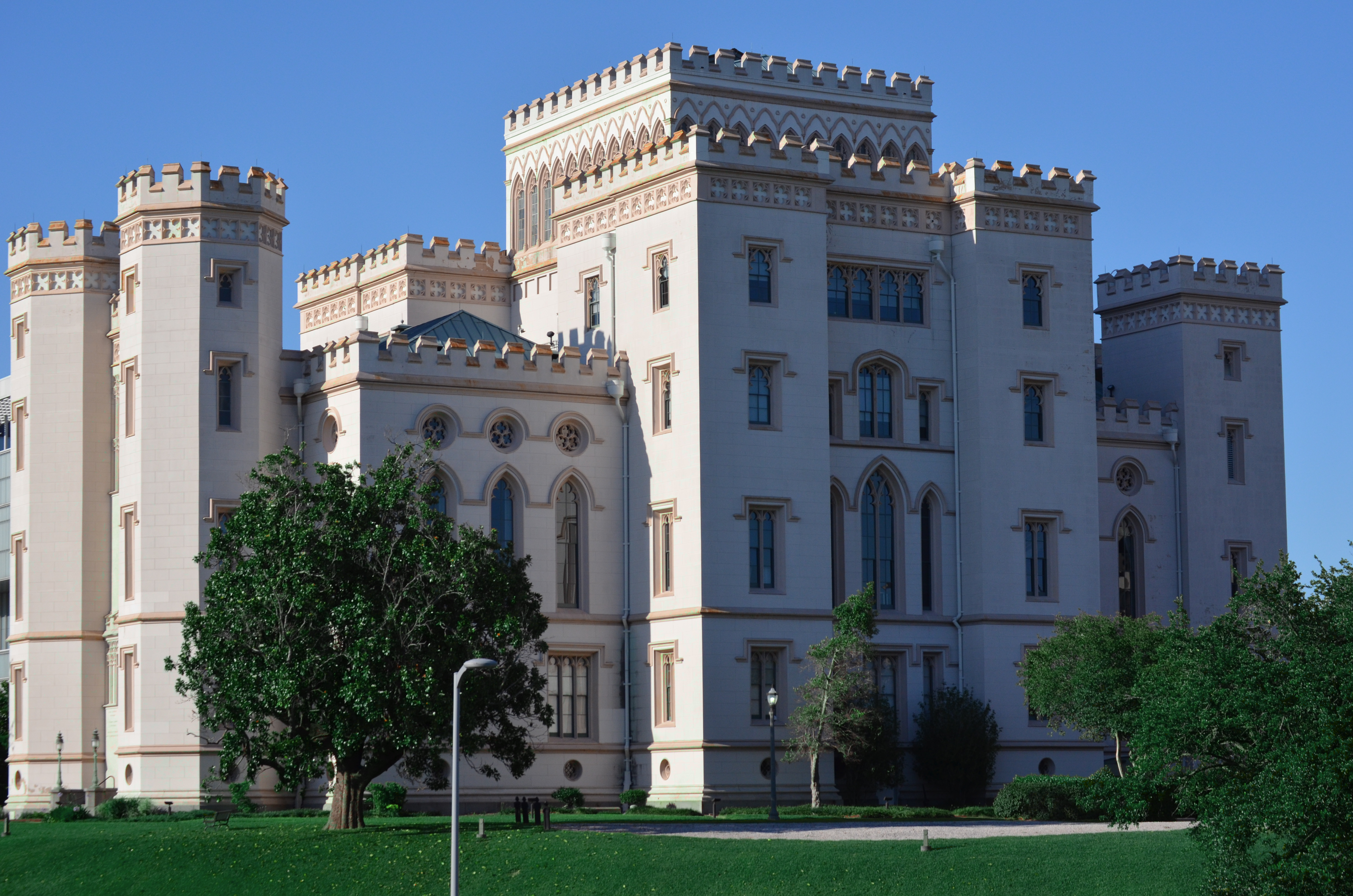
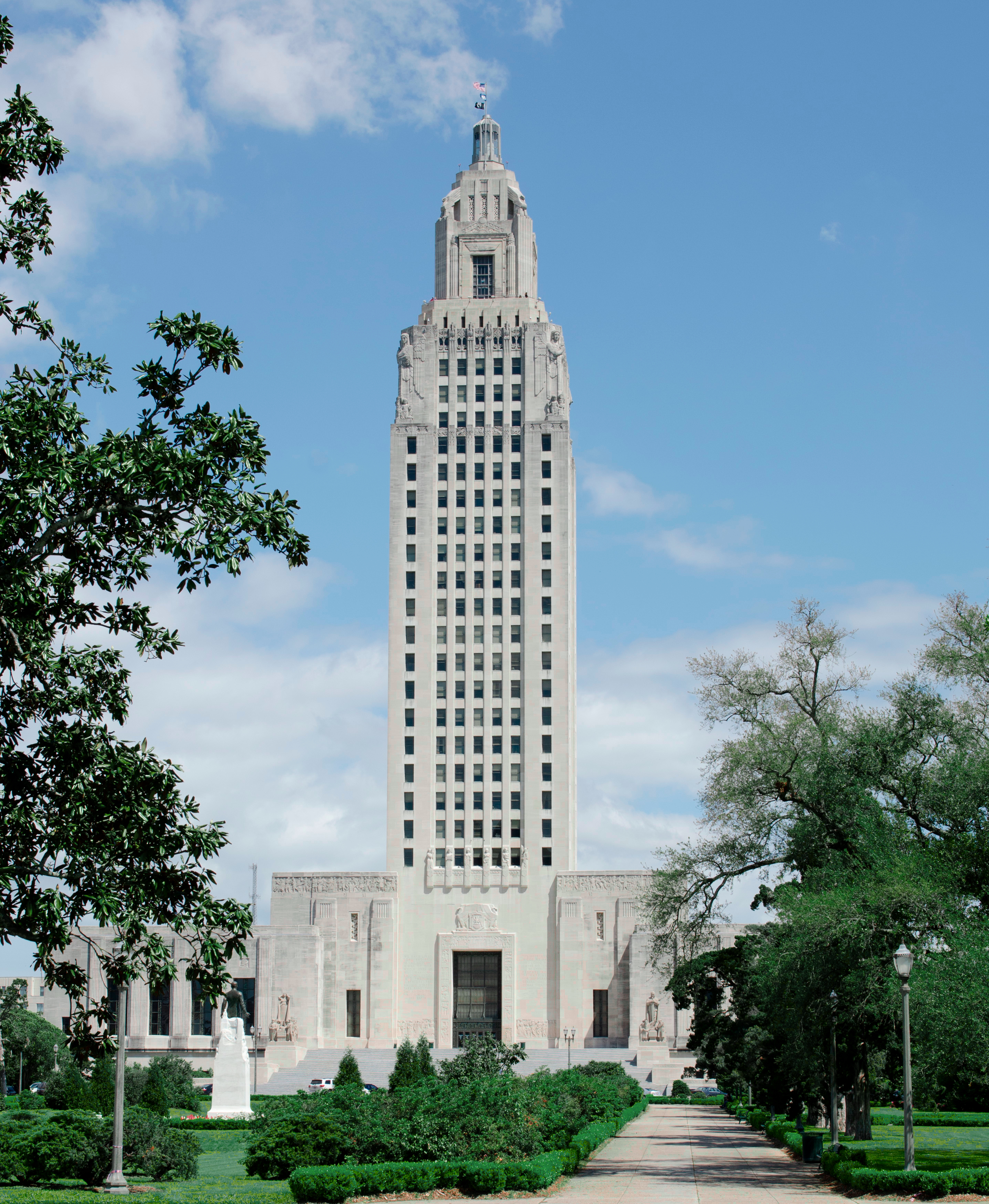
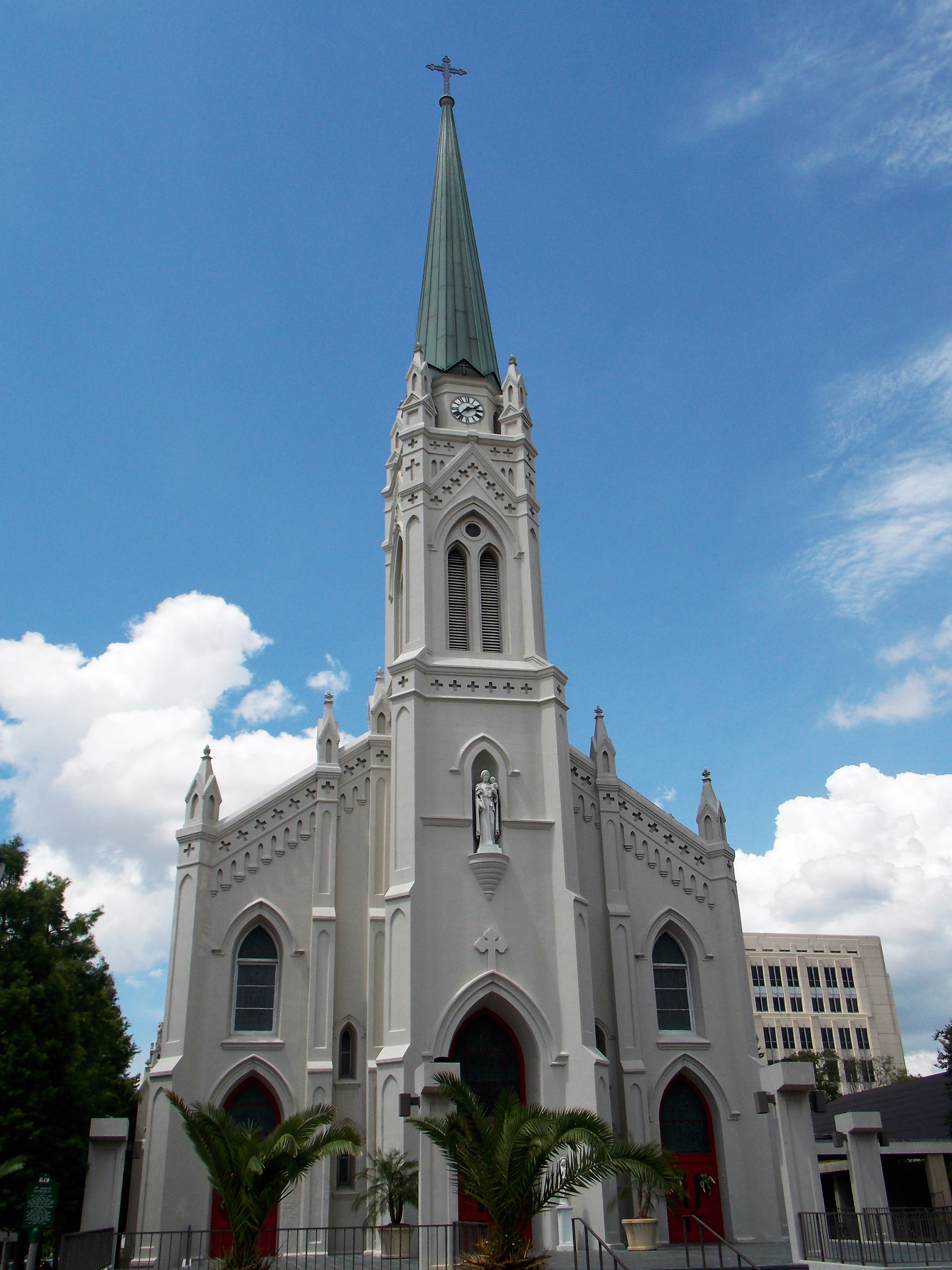
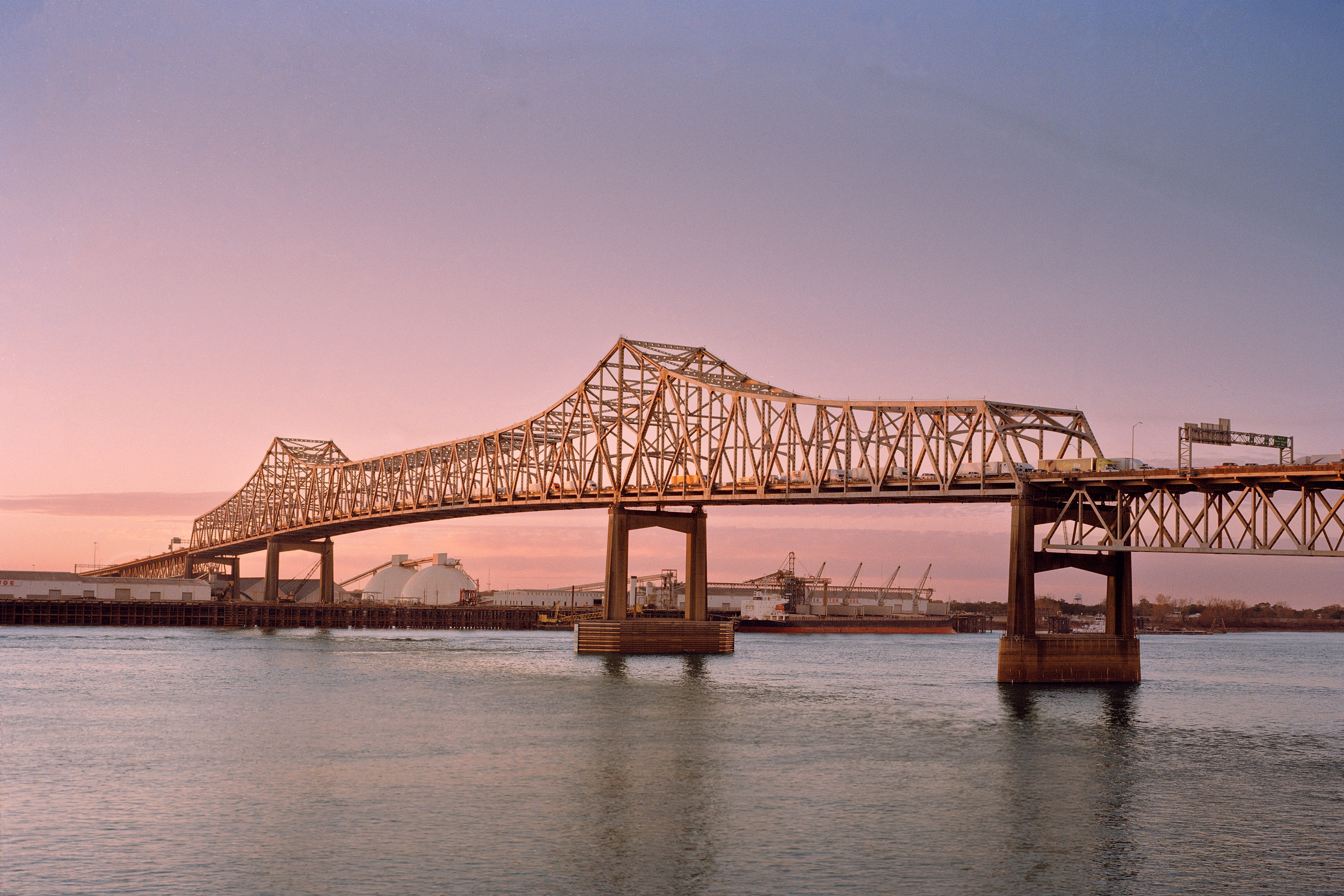
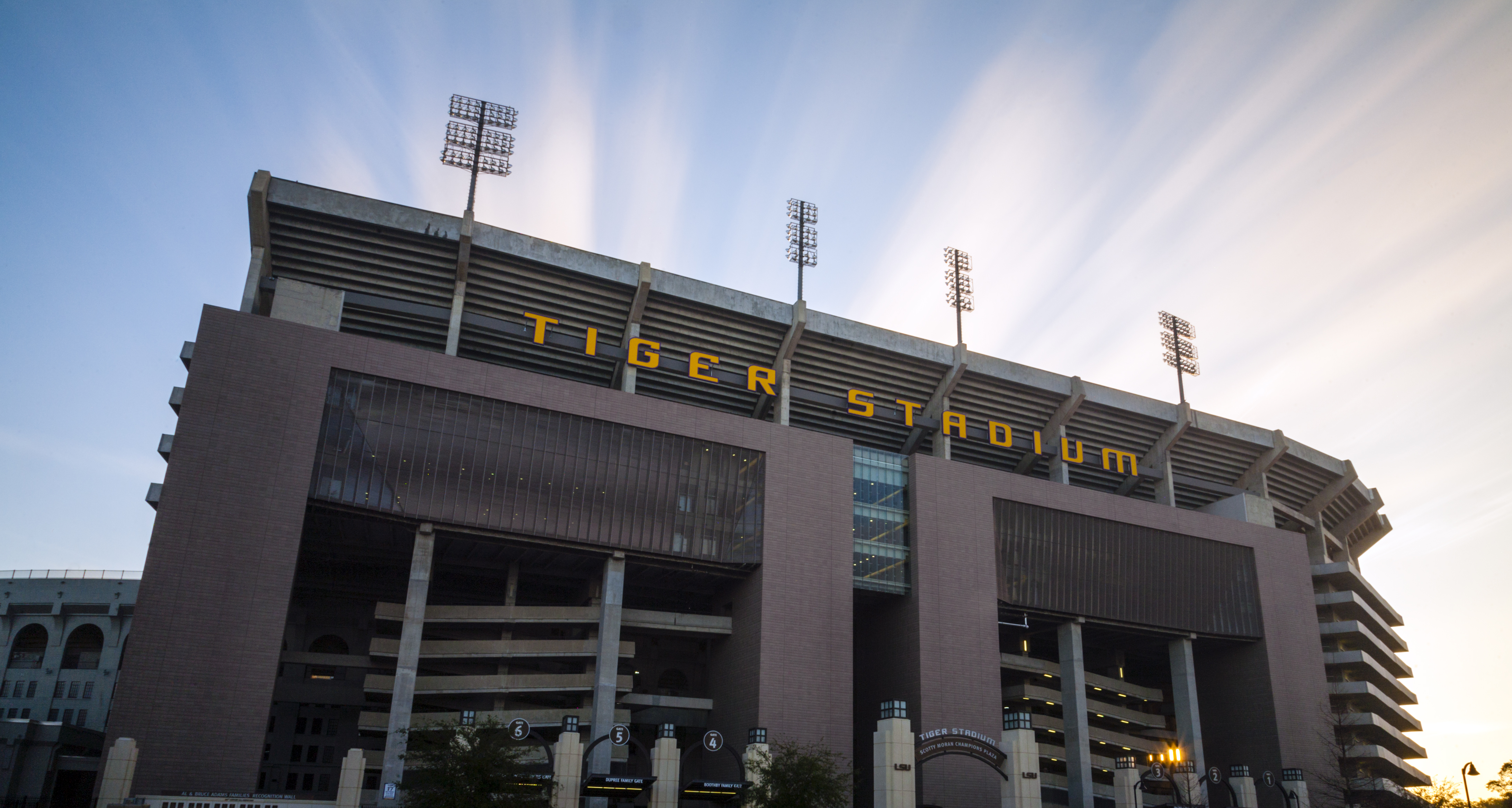
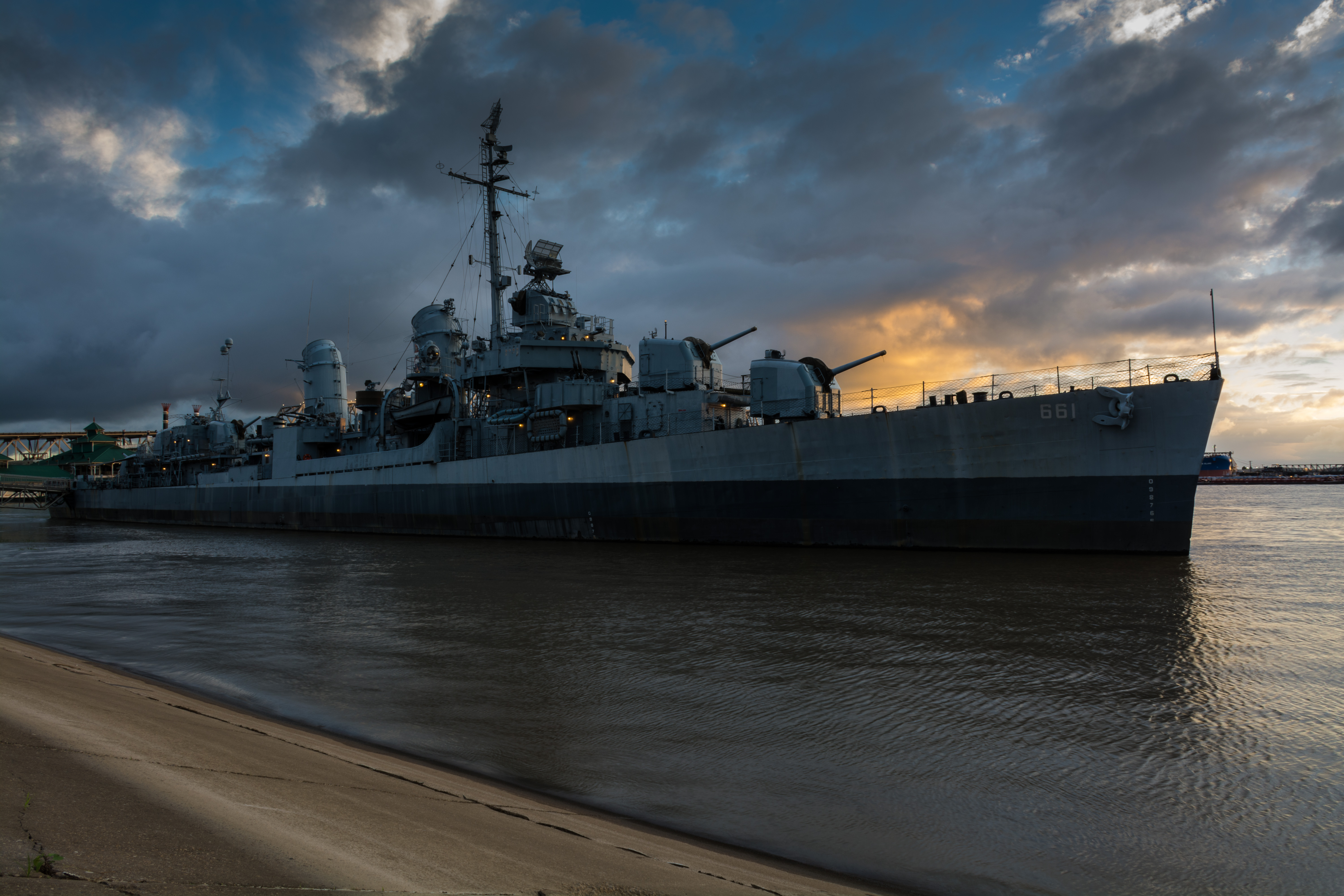
- Downtown Baton Rouge Old Louisiana State Capitol Louisiana State Capitol St. Joseph Cathedral Horace Wilkinson Bridge Tiger Stadium (LSU) USS Kidd

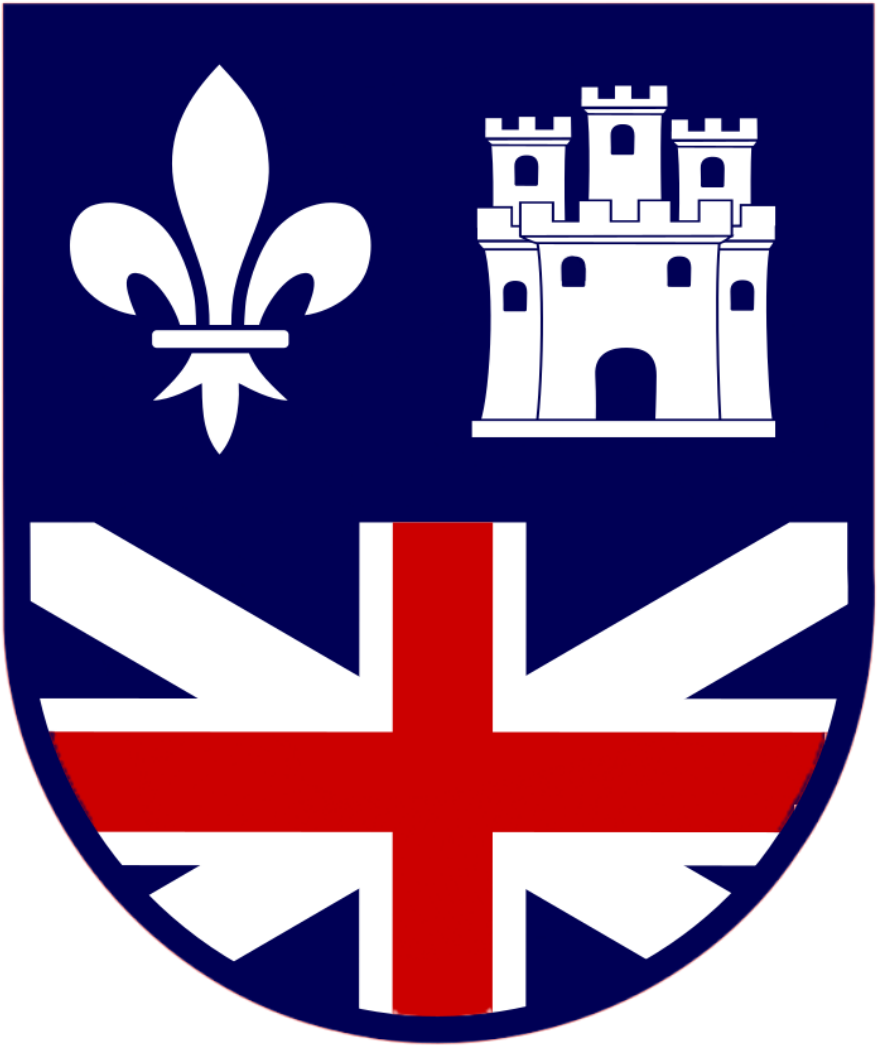
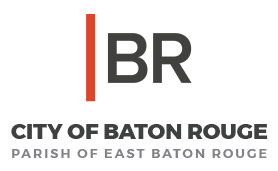
- Flag Seal Coat of arms Wordmark
- Etymology: from French bâton rouge 'red stick'
- Nicknames: Red Stick, The Capital City, B.R.
- Location in East Baton Rouge Parish and the state of Louisiana

- Location in the United States
- Coordinates: 30°26′51″N 91°10′43″W
- Country: United States
- State: Louisiana
- Parish: East Baton Rouge
- Founded: 1699
- Settled: 1721
- Incorporated: January 16, 1817

Government
  - Mayor-President: Sid Edwards (R)

Area
  - State capital city and consolidated city-parish: 88.52 sq mi (229.27 km^{2})
  - Land: 86.32 sq mi (223.56 km^{2})
  - Water: 2.20 sq mi (5.71 km^{2}) 2.81%
  - Total (Note: Total area for the City of Baton Rouge, not all of East Baton Rouge Parish): 79.11 sq mi (204.89 km^{2})
- Elevation: 46 ft (14 m)

Population (2020)
  - State capital city and consolidated city-parish: 227,470
  - Rank: US: 108th
  - Density: 2,635/sq mi (1,017.5/km^{2})
  - Urban: 631,326 (US: 67th)
  - Urban density: 1,590/sq mi (615/km^{2})
  - Metro: 888,699 (US: 66th)
- Demonym: Baton Rougean
- Time zone: UTC−06:00 (CST)
  - Summer (DST): UTC−05:00 (CDT)
- ZIP Codes: 70801–70817, 70819–70823, 70825–70827, 70831, 70833, 70835–70837, 70874, 70879, 70883, 70884, 70892–70896, 70898
- Area code: 225
- FIPS code: 22-05000
- GNIS feature ID: 1629914
- Website: brla.gov

Baton Rouge (/ˌbætən ˈruːʒ/ BAT-ən ROOZH; French: Bâton-Rouge, pronounced [bɑtɔ̃ ʁuʒ]; lit. 'Red Baton') is the capital city of the U.S. state of Louisiana. It had a population of 227,470 at the 2020 United States census, making it Louisiana's second-most populous city. It is the seat of Louisiana's most populous parish, East Baton Rouge Parish, and the center of Louisiana's second-largest metropolitan area, Greater Baton Rouge, which had 870,569 residents in 2020.

Located on the eastern bank of the Mississippi River, the Baton Rouge area owes its historical importance to its strategic site upon the Istrouma Bluff, the first natural bluff upriver from the Mississippi River Delta at the Gulf of Mexico. This allowed the development of a business quarter safe from seasonal flooding. In addition, it built a levee system stretching from the bluff southward to protect the riverfront and low-lying agricultural areas.

Baton Rouge has developed as a culturally rich center, settled by immigrants from European nations and African peoples brought to North America as slaves or indentured servants. It was ruled by six different nations: the French, Spanish and British in the colonial era; briefly the Republic of West Florida; the United States as a territory and a state; the Confederate States of America; and the United States again since the end of the American Civil War. The city developed as a multicultural region practicing many religious traditions from Catholicism to Protestantism and Louisiana Voodoo.

Baton Rouge is a major industrial, petrochemical, medical, research, motion picture, and technology center of the Southern United States. It is the location of Louisiana State University, the LSU system's flagship university and the state's largest institution of higher education. It is also the location of Southern University, the flagship institution of the Southern University System—the nation's only historically black college system.

The Port of Greater Baton Rouge is the tenth-largest in the U.S. by tonnage shipped, and it is the farthest upstream Mississippi River port capable of handling Panamax ships. Major corporations participating in the Baton Rouge metropolitan statistical area's economy include Amazon, Lamar Advertising Company, BBQGuys, Marucci Sports, Piccadilly Restaurants, Raising Cane's Chicken Fingers, ExxonMobil, Brown & Root, Shell, and Dow Chemical Company.

== History ==
=== Pre-history ===
Human habitation in the Baton Rouge area has been dated to 12000–6500 BC, based on evidence found along the Mississippi, Comite, and Amite rivers. Earthwork mounds were built by hunter-gatherer societies in the Middle Archaic period, from roughly the fourth millennium BC. The speakers of the Proto-Muskogean language divided into its descendant languages by about 1000 BC; and a cultural boundary between either side of Mobile Bay and the Black Warrior River began to appear between about 1200 BC and 500 BC—a period called the Middle "Gulf Formational Stage". The Eastern Muskogean language began to diversify internally in the first half of the first millennium AD.

The early Muskogean societies were the bearers of the Mississippian culture, which formed around 800 AD and extended in a vast network across the Mississippi and Ohio valleys, with numerous chiefdoms in the Southeast, as well. By the time the Spanish made their first forays inland from the shores of the Gulf of Mexico in the early 16th century, by some evidence many political centers of the Mississippians were already in decline, or abandoned. At the time, this region appeared to have been occupied by a collection of moderately sized native chiefdoms, interspersed with autonomous villages and tribal groups. Other evidence indicates these Mississippian settlements were thriving at the time of the first Spanish contact. Later Spanish expeditions encountered the remains of groups who had lost many people and been disrupted in the aftermath of infectious diseases, chronic among Europeans, unknowingly introduced by the first expedition.

=== Colonial period ===
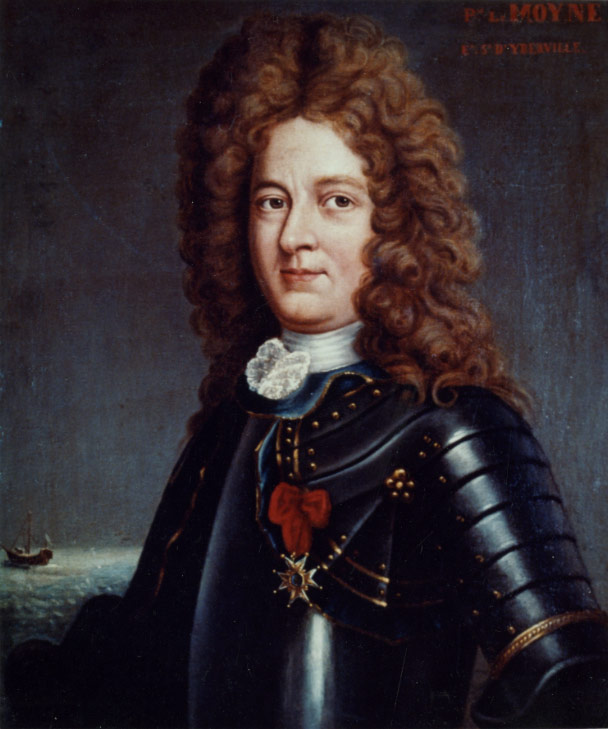
Pierre Le Moyne, Sieur d'Iberville, named Baton Rouge and lakes Pontchartrain and Maurepas in the early French colonial era

French explorer Pierre Le Moyne d'Iberville led an exploration party up the Mississippi River in 1698. The explorers saw a red pole marking the boundary between the Houma and Bayagoula tribal hunting grounds. The French name le bâton rouge ("the red stick") is the translation of a native term rendered as Istrouma, possibly a corruption of the Choctaw iti humma ("red pole"); André-Joseph Pénicaut—a carpenter traveling with d'Iberville—published the first full-length account of the expedition in 1723. According to Pénicaut:

From there [Manchacq] we went five leagues higher and found very high banks called écorts in that region, and in savage called Istrouma which means red stick [bâton rouge], as at this place there is a post painted red that the savages have sunk there to mark the land line between the two nations, namely: the land of the Bayagoulas which they were leaving and the land of another nation—thirty leagues upstream from the baton rouge—named the Oumas.

The red pole was presumably at Scott's Bluff, on what is now the campus of Southern University. It was reportedly a 30-foot-high (9.1 m) painted pole adorned with fish bones.

European settlement of Baton Rouge began in 1721 when French colonists established a military and trading post. Since then, Baton Rouge has been governed by France, Britain, Spain, Louisiana, the Republic of West Florida, the United States, the Confederate States, and the United States again. In 1755, when French settlers in the colony of Acadia (known as Acadians) were deported from there by British authorities, many took up residence in rural Louisiana, including Baton Rouge. Popularly known as Cajuns, they maintained a distinct culture for centuries. From 1763 to 1783, Baton Rouge was part of the British North American colony of West Florida, though it was captured by Spanish forces in September 1779. During the first half of the 19th century, Baton Rouge grew steadily as the result of steamboat trade and transportation.

=== Incorporation and growth ===
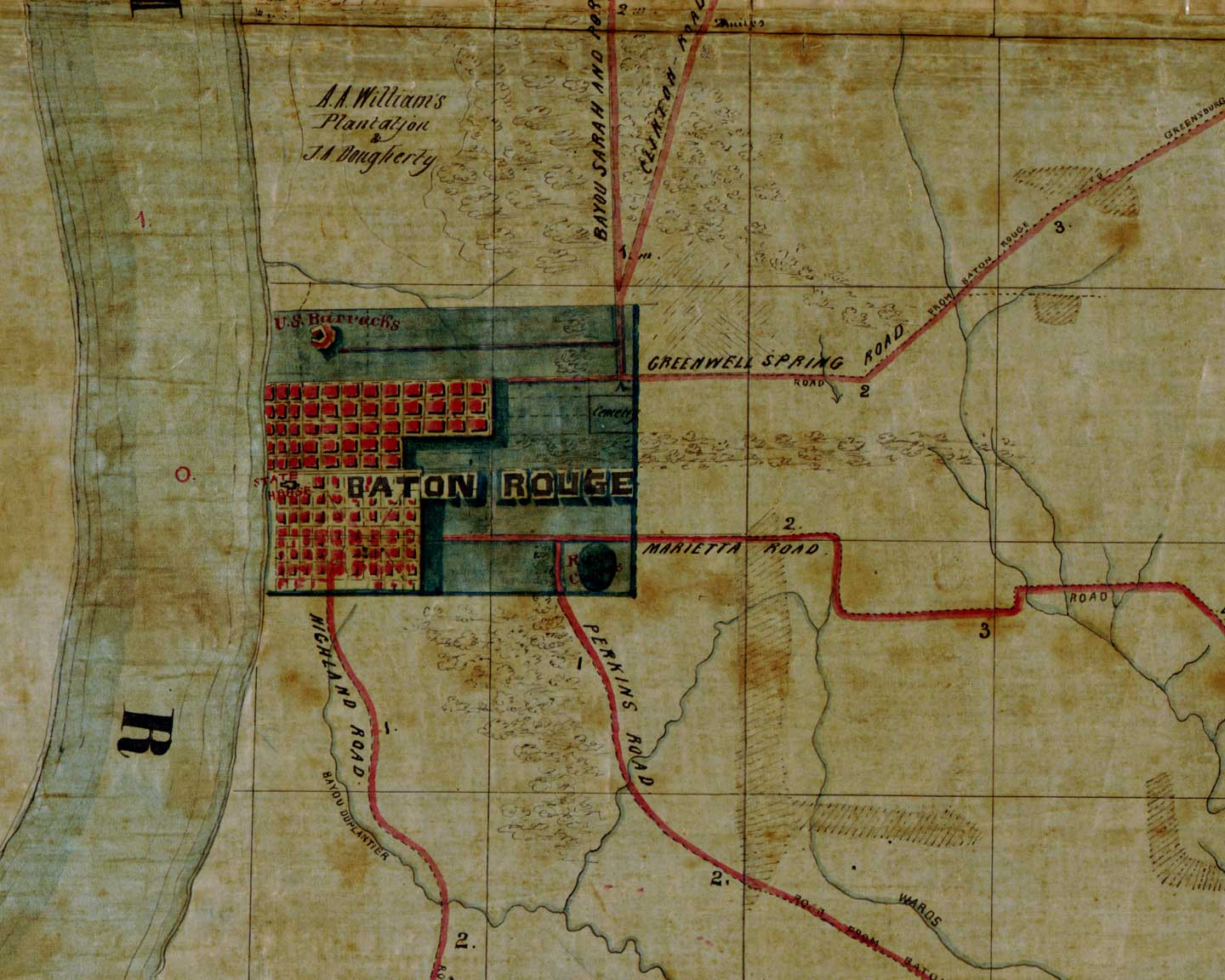
Baton Rouge in 1863

Baton Rouge was incorporated in 1817. In 1822, the Pentagon Barracks complex of buildings was completed. The site was used by Spanish, French, and British authorities and was occupied by both the Confederate States Army and United States Army. It was also part of the short-lived Republic of West Florida. In 1951, ownership of the barracks was transferred to the state of Louisiana. In 1976, the complex was listed on the National Register of Historic Places.

Acquisition of Louisiana by the United States in 1803 was a catalyst for increased Anglo-American settlement, especially in the northern part of the state. In 1846, the state legislature designated Baton Rouge as Louisiana's new capital to replace New Orleans. The architect James Dakin was hired to design the old Louisiana State Capitol, with construction beginning in late 1847.

Rather than mimic the United States Capitol, as many other states had done, he designed a capitol in Neo-Gothic style, complete with turrets and crenellations, and stained glass; it overlooks the Mississippi. It has been described as the "most distinguished example of Gothic Revival" architecture in the state and has been designated as a National Historic Landmark.

By the outbreak of the American Civil War, the population of Baton Rouge was nearly 5,500. The war nearly halted economic progress, except for businesses associated with supplying the Union Army occupation of the city, which began in the spring of 1862 and lasted for the duration of the war. The Confederates at first consolidated their forces elsewhere, during which time the state government moved to Opelousas and later Shreveport. In the summer of 1862, about 2,600 Confederate troops under generals John C. Breckinridge (the former Vice President of the United States) and Daniel Ruggles attempted to recapture Baton Rouge.

After the war, New Orleans temporarily served as the seat of the Reconstruction era state government. When the Bourbon Democrats regained power in 1882, after considerable intimidation and voter suppression of black Republicans, they returned the state government to Baton Rouge, where it has since remained. In his 1893 guidebook, Karl Baedeker described Baton Rouge as "the Capital of Louisiana, a quaint old place with 10,378 inhabitants, on a bluff above the Mississippi".

In the 1950s and 1960s, the petrochemical industry boomed in Baton Rouge, stimulating the city's expansion beyond its original center. The changing market in the oil business has produced fluctuations in the industry, affecting employment in the city and area. In 1953, there was a bus boycott by black riders who were forbidden to occupy seats reserved for whites, leading eventually to some improvement of their rights.

On January 10, 1972, a shootout between members of the Nation of Islam (NOI) and the police left two sheriff's deputies and two Black men dead. Thirty-one people were injured, including 14 police. Governor John McKeithen then ordered 700 Louisiana National Guard to patrol the city. Baton Rouge Mayor-President Woodrow Wilson "W. W." Dumas subsequently imposed an evening to early-morning curfew. On January 14, the curfew was lifted.

A building boom began in the city in the 1990s and continued into the 2000s, during which Baton Rouge became one of the fastest-growing cities in the Southern United States in terms of technology. Metropolitan Baton Rouge was ranked as one of the fastest-growing metropolitan areas in the U.S. (with a population under 1 million), with 602,894 in 2000 and 802,484 people as of the 2010 U.S. census. After the extensive damage in New Orleans and along the coast from Hurricane Katrina on August 29, 2005, the city took in as many as 200,000 displaced residents.

In 2010, Baton Rouge started a market push to become a test city for Google's new super high speed fiber optic line known as GeauxFiBR.

In July 2016, the Greater Baton Rouge metropolitan area was heavily affected by the shooting of Alton Sterling. His death led to multiple protests and the shooting of police officers. President Barack Obama also made remarks on the shooting of Alton Sterling. By February 2021, Sterling's family was given a $4.5 million settlement to settle a wrongful death lawsuit. In August 2016, the city and metropolitan area were severely flooded.

During the runoff for District 3 of the Louisiana Public Service Commission in December 2022, many Baton Rougeans helped elect Davante Lewis—the first openly LGBT politician to the state government.

On April 28, 2024, the Louisiana State Supreme Court gave the city of St. George the right to secede from Baton Rouge, in a 4–3 decision.

== Geography ==
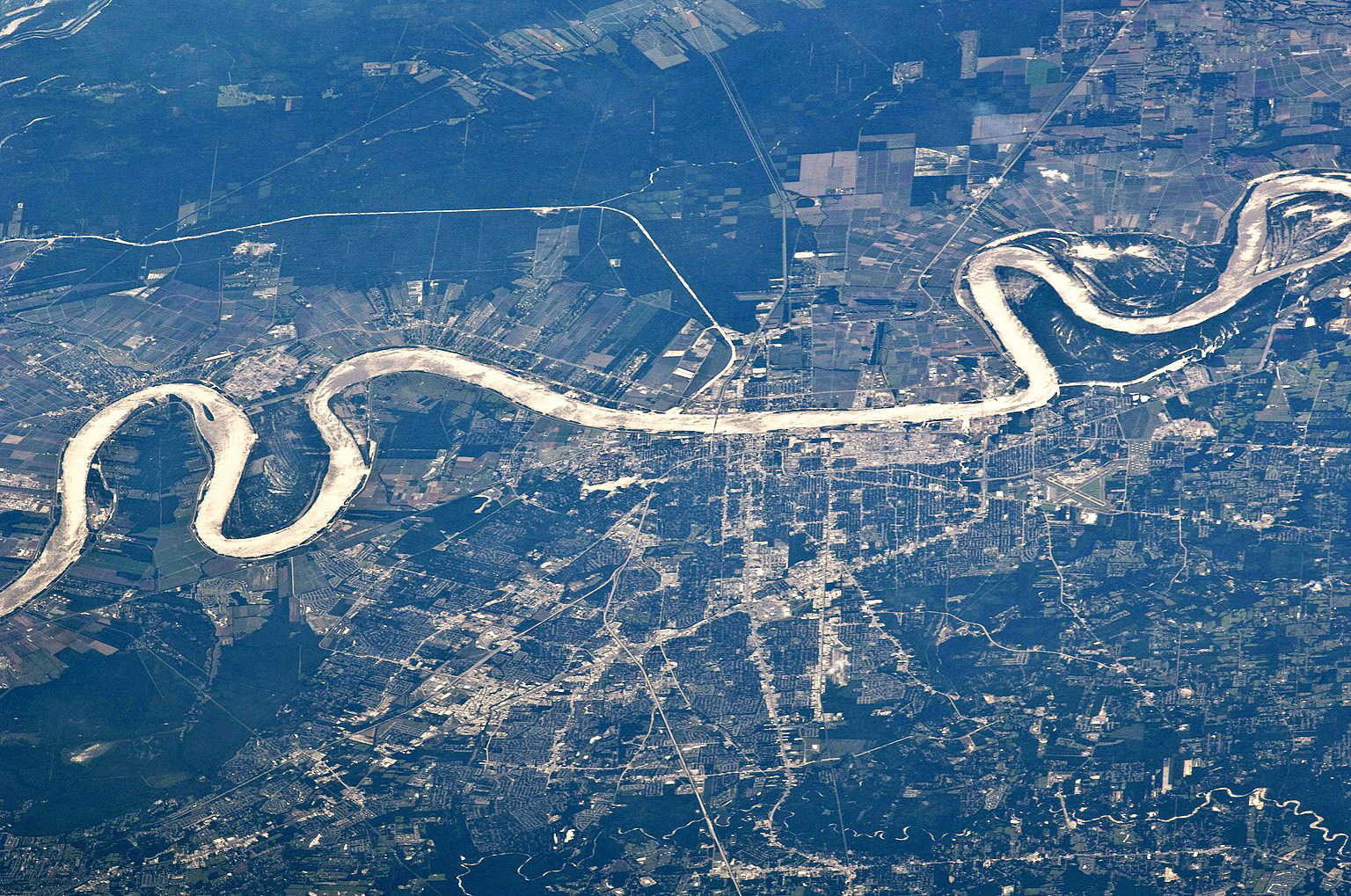
Baton Rouge as viewed from the International Space Station, May 2011, looking west

The city of Baton Rouge lies on the banks of the Mississippi River in southeastern Louisiana's Florida Parishes region. The city is about 79 miles (127 km) from New Orleans, 126 miles (203 km) from Alexandria, 56 miles (90 km) from Lafayette and 250 miles (400 km) from Shreveport. It is also 173 miles (278 km) from Jackson, Mississippi and 272 miles (438 km) from Houston, Texas. Baton Rouge lies on a low elevation of 17 meters or 56 feet to a little over 19 meters or 62 feet above sea level.

Baton Rouge is the capital of Louisiana and the parish seat of East Baton Rouge Parish. According to the United States Census Bureau, the city has an area of 79.15 square miles (205.0 km^{2}), of which 76.95 square miles (199.3 km^{2}) are land and 2.2 square miles (5.7 km^{2}) (2.81%) are covered by water.

Baton Rouge is on the first set of bluffs north of the Mississippi River Delta's coastal plains. Because of its prominent location along the river and on the bluffs, which prevents flooding, the French built a fort in the city in 1719. Baton Rouge is the third-southernmost capital city in the continental United States, after Austin, Texas, and Tallahassee, Florida. It is the cultural and economic center of the Greater Baton Rouge metropolitan area.

=== Climate ===
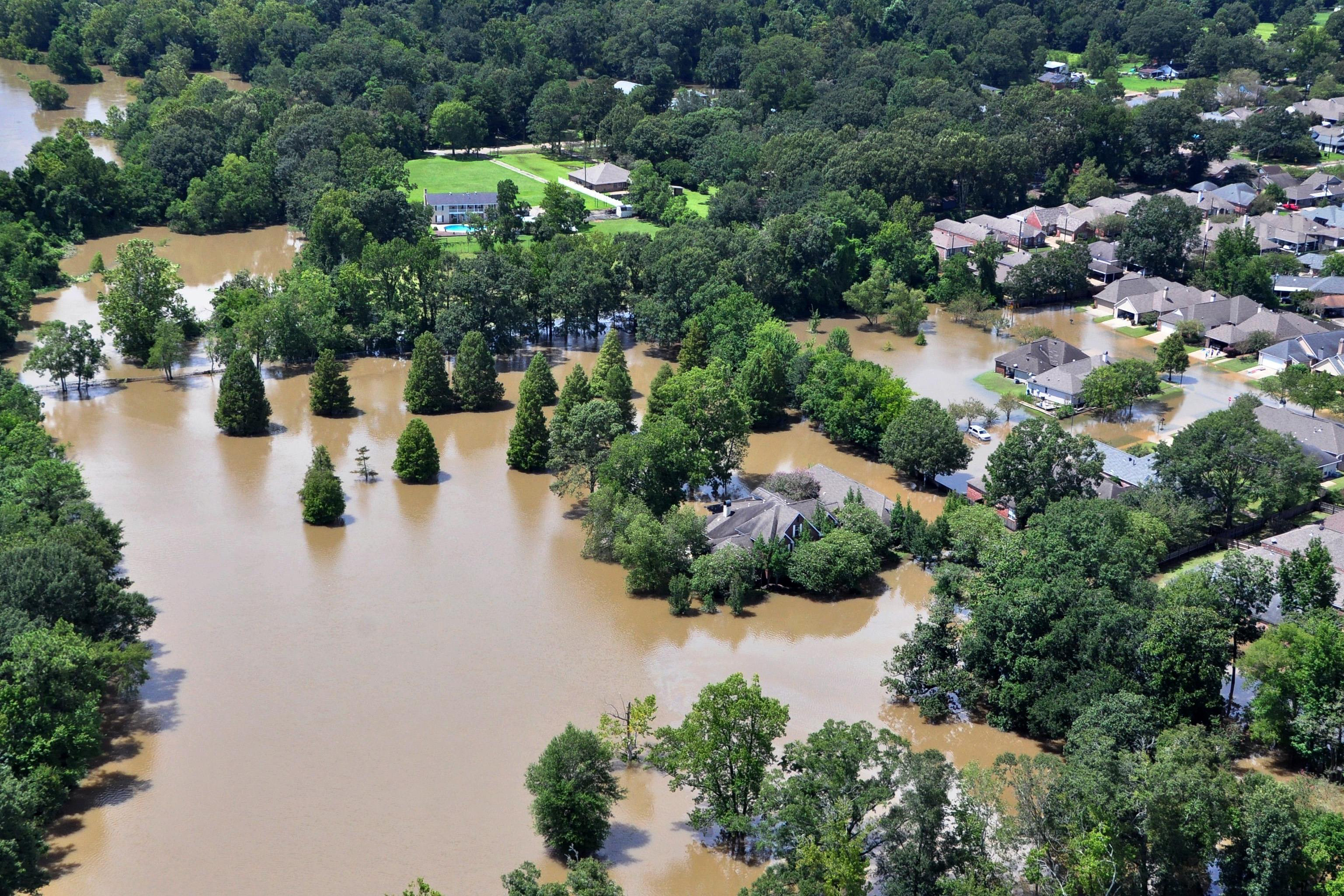
Baton Rouge, 2016 Louisiana flood

Baton Rouge has a humid subtropical climate (Köppen Cfa). It has mild winters, hot and humid summers, moderate to heavy rainfall, and the possibility of damaging winds and tornadoes yearlong. The area's average precipitation is 61.94 inches (141.1 cm) of rain and 0.1 inches (0.25 cm) of snow annually. With ample precipitation, Baton Rouge is fifth on the list of wettest cities in the United States. Snow in the Baton Rouge area is usually rare, although it snowed in three consecutive years at the first decade of the 21st century: December 11, 2008, December 4, 2009, and February 12, 2010. In 2017, Baton Rouge received snow again. In January 2025, Baton Rouge as well as all of southern Louisiana received record snowfall in a once-in-a-lifetime blizzard. The yearly average temperature for Baton Rouge is 68.4 °F (20.2 °C). The average temperature for January is 51.7 °F (10.9 °C) and July is 83.0 °F (28.3 °C). The area is usually free from extremes in temperature, with some cold winter fronts, but those are usually brief.

Baton Rouge's proximity to the Gulf of Mexico exposes the city and metropolitan area to hurricanes. On September 1, 2008, Hurricane Gustav struck the city and became the worst hurricane ever to hit the Baton Rouge area. Winds topped 100 miles per hour (160 km/h), knocking down trees and powerlines and making roads impassable. The roofs of many buildings suffered tree damage, especially in the Highland Road, Garden District, and Goodwood areas. The city was shut down for five days and a curfew was put in effect. Rooftop shingles were ripped off, signs blew down, and minor structural damage occurred.

Climate data for Baton Rouge, Louisiana (Metropolitan Airport), 1991–2020 normals, (Note: Mean monthly maxima and minima (i.e. the highest and lowest temperature readings during an entire month or year) calculated based on data at said location from 1991 to 2020.) extremes 1892–present
Month	Jan	Feb	Mar	Apr	May	Jun	Jul	Aug	Sep	Oct	Nov	Dec	Year
Record high °F (°C)	85 (29)	88 (31)	93 (34)	96 (36)	101 (38)	103 (39)	103 (39)	110 (43)	104 (40)	98 (37)	91 (33)	88 (31)	110 (43)
Mean maximum °F (°C)	77.5 (25.3)	80.3 (26.8)	84.3 (29.1)	87.7 (30.9)	92.2 (33.4)	95.5 (35.3)	96.7 (35.9)	97.5 (36.4)	95.3 (35.2)	90.7 (32.6)	83.9 (28.8)	80.0 (26.7)	98.4 (36.9)
Mean daily maximum °F (°C)	62.3 (16.8)	66.6 (19.2)	73.0 (22.8)	79.1 (26.2)	85.8 (29.9)	90.5 (32.5)	91.9 (33.3)	92.2 (33.4)	88.7 (31.5)	80.9 (27.2)	71.0 (21.7)	64.3 (17.9)	78.9 (26.1)
Daily mean °F (°C)	52.0 (11.1)	55.9 (13.3)	62.0 (16.7)	68.0 (20.0)	75.5 (24.2)	81.0 (27.2)	82.9 (28.3)	82.8 (28.2)	78.8 (26.0)	69.5 (20.8)	59.4 (15.2)	53.8 (12.1)	68.5 (20.3)
Mean daily minimum °F (°C)	41.6 (5.3)	45.3 (7.4)	51.0 (10.6)	56.9 (13.8)	65.1 (18.4)	71.5 (21.9)	73.8 (23.2)	73.3 (22.9)	68.9 (20.5)	58.1 (14.5)	47.8 (8.8)	43.3 (6.3)	58.0 (14.4)
Mean minimum °F (°C)	24.3 (−4.3)	29.2 (−1.6)	32.7 (0.4)	40.4 (4.7)	51.3 (10.7)	63.6 (17.6)	69.0 (20.6)	67.4 (19.7)	56.4 (13.6)	40.9 (4.9)	30.9 (−0.6)	27.3 (−2.6)	22.6 (−5.2)
Record low °F (°C)	7 (−14)	2 (−17)	20 (−7)	31 (−1)	40 (4)	53 (12)	58 (14)	58 (14)	43 (6)	30 (−1)	21 (−6)	8 (−13)	2 (−17)
Average precipitation inches (mm)	6.36 (162)	4.42 (112)	4.46 (113)	5.08 (129)	5.23 (133)	6.45 (164)	5.09 (129)	6.37 (162)	4.42 (112)	4.84 (123)	3.90 (99)	5.32 (135)	61.94 (1,573)
Average snowfall inches (cm)	0.0 (0.0)	0.0 (0.0)	0.0 (0.0)	0.0 (0.0)	0.0 (0.0)	0.0 (0.0)	0.0 (0.0)	0.0 (0.0)	0.0 (0.0)	0.0 (0.0)	0.0 (0.0)	0.2 (0.51)	0.2 (0.51)
Average precipitation days (≥ 0.01 in)	9.9	8.9	8.9	8.0	8.2	11.6	13.2	11.8	8.6	7.3	8.0	9.7	114.1
Average snowy days (≥ 0.1 in)	0.0	0.0	0.0	0.0	0.0	0.0	0.0	0.0	0.0	0.0	0.0	0.1	0.1
Average relative humidity (%)	74.1	70.9	70.0	70.6	72.3	74.4	77.2	77.7	76.9	72.8	74.6	74.7	73.8
Source: NOAA (relative humidity 1961–1990)

=== Environment ===
Several studies note high rates of cancer, premature birth and low birth weight in the 85-mile corridor between Baton Rouge and New Orleans. Known as "Cancer Alley", the area has a predominately African-American population. The primary cause is thought to be air pollution created by the petrochemical industry.

== Demographics ==
Historical population
Census	Pop.	Note	%±
1810	469		—
1840	2,269		—
1850	3,905		72.1%
1860	5,428		39.0%
1870	6,498		19.7%
1880	7,197		10.8%
1890	10,478		45.6%
1900	11,269		7.5%
1910	14,897		32.2%
1920	21,782		46.2%
1930	30,729		41.1%
1940	34,719		13.0%
1950	125,629		261.8%
1960	152,419		21.3%
1970	165,921		8.9%
1980	220,394		32.8%
1990	219,531		−0.4%
2000	227,818		3.8%
2010	229,493		0.7%
2020	227,470		−0.9%
2025 (est.)	222,795	▼	−2.1%
U.S. Decennial Census; 2018 Estimate

Prior to colonization, Native Americans were once the primary residents of present-day Baton Rouge. With the coming of European colonization, and the migration of American settlers after the Louisiana Purchase, European and African-descended peoples became the predominant groups in the area by birth rates and immigration to a 1860 population of 5,428. Since reaching its first historic high of 220,394 residents at the 1980 U.S. census, the city's population has expanded and contracted twice: from 219,531 in 1990, to 227,818 in 2000—the second historic high—and 229,493, the city-proper's third historic high in 2010, to 227,470 at the 2020 United States census. The black population gradually increased in Baton Rouge after the Civil War.

Including the consolidated city–parish of Baton Rouge in 2019 (East Baton Rouge Parish), the American Community Survey estimated 443,763 people lived in the area. In 2020, the U.S. Census Bureau determined 456,781 people lived in the consolidated city–parish. The metropolitan population of Baton Rouge increased to 3.6% as a result of suburbanization in 2019, to an estimated 854,884. In 2020, the metropolitan statistical area's population increased to 870,569 residents, reflecting southern Louisiana's population growth in contrast with northern Louisiana's stagnation and decline.

In 2019, the city of Baton Rouge had a population density of 2,982.5 people per square mile.

=== Racial and ethnic composition ===
Baton Rouge city, Louisiana – Racial and ethnic composition Note: the US Census treats Hispanic/Latino as an ethnic category. This table excludes Latinos from the racial categories and assigns them to a separate category. Hispanics/Latinos may be of any race.
Race / Ethnicity (NH = Non-Hispanic)	Pop 2000	Pop 2010	Pop 2020	% 2000	% 2010	% 2020
White alone (NH)	101,867	86,679	77,829	44.71%	37.77%	34.22%
Black or African American alone (NH)	113,478	124,542	121,799	49.81%	54.27%	53.55%
Native American or Alaska Native alone (NH)	376	397	382	0.17%	0.17%	0.17%
Asian alone (NH)	5,940	7,469	7,294	2.61%	3.25%	3.21%
Native Hawaiian or Pacific Islander alone (NH)	68	39	67	0.03%	0.02%	0.03%
Other race alone (NH)	253	332	784	0.11%	0.14%	0.34%
Mixed race or Multiracial (NH)	1,918	2,382	5,797	0.84%	1.04%	2.55%
Hispanic or Latino (any race)	3,918	7,653	13,518	1.72%	3.33%	5.94%
Total	227,818	229,493	227,470	100.00%	100.00%	100.00%

With the population growth of European and African-descended peoples in present-day Baton Rouge, as well as the Indian Removal Act, the Native American population declined to one of the smallest minority groups in the area. With the increase among people of color during the 20th century, Baton Rouge has also declined as a predominantly non-Hispanic white city, hastened by suburbanization, aging out, and white flight. In 1970, non-Hispanic whites were 70.5% of the population. In 2020, they were 34.2% of the total population.

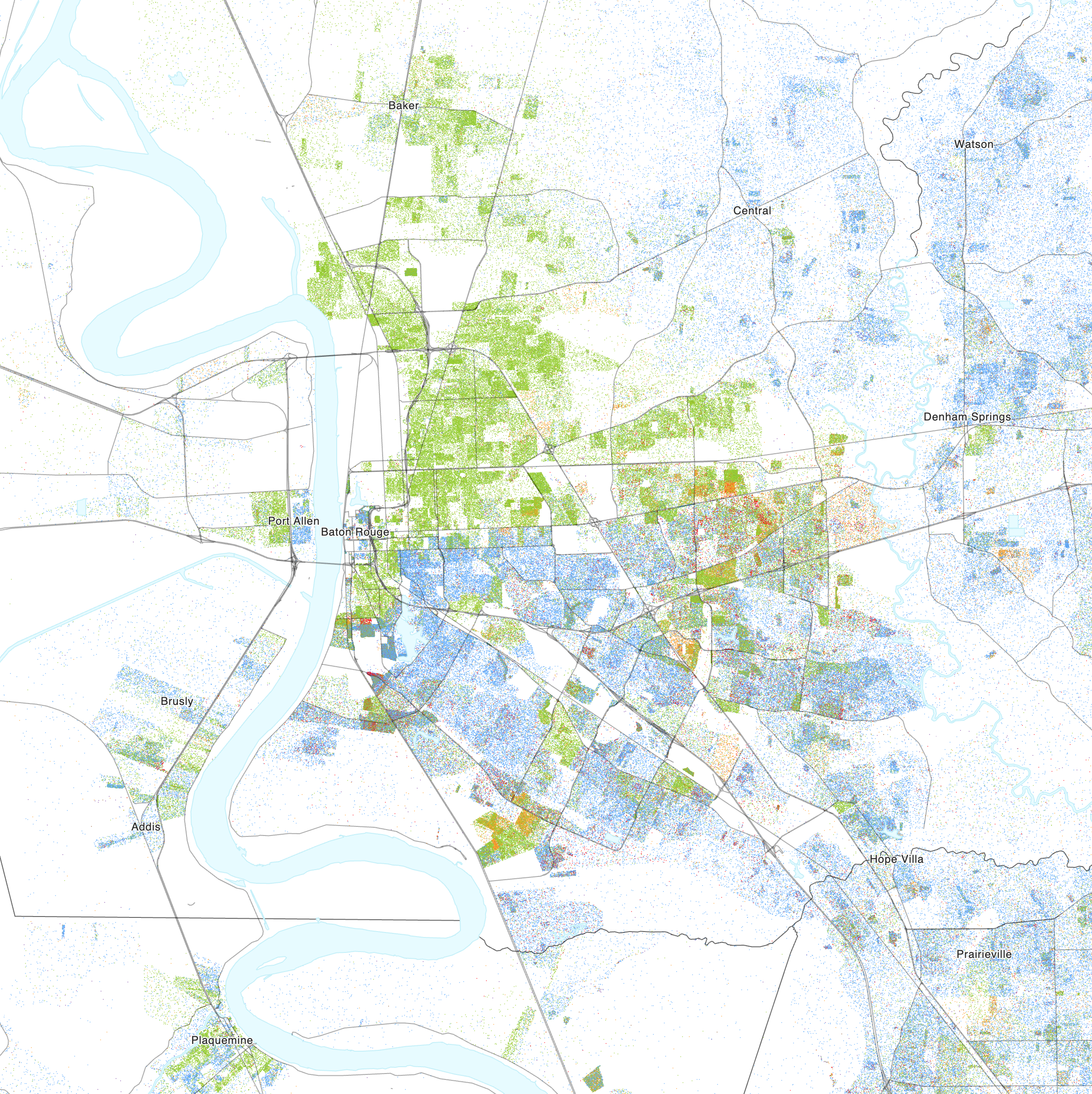
A racial distribution map of Baton Rouge, 2020 U.S. census. Each dot is one person: ⬤ White ⬤ Black ⬤ Asian ⬤ Hispanic ⬤ Multiracial ⬤ Native American/Other

In the 2020 United States census, Black or African Americans made up the majority (53.55%) of the city-proper's population. In 2021 census estimates, Black or African Americans made up the largest share of youths. The remaining racial and ethnic makeup for the city in 2020 was 34.22% non-Hispanic white, 0.17% American Indian and Alaska Native, 3.21% Asian, 0.03% Native Hawaiian or other Pacific Islander, 2.55% two or more races, and 5.94% Hispanic and Latino American of any race. The growing Hispanic and Latino population reflected increasing trends of nationwide diversification. Among the population of the city and metropolitan area, a substantial number identify as Cajun or Louisiana Creole. The most reported ancestries in 2020 were: African American (34.5%), English (9%), Irish (5.7%), German (5.6%), French (5.6%), Italian (3.1%), Mexican (1.7%), Scottish (1.6%), Vietnamese (1.5%), and Honduran (1.1%).

=== Sexual orientation and identity ===
During the middle of the 20th century, The Advocate and other region-wide newspapers discriminated against the lesbian, gay, bisexual and transgender community. In 1969, the Krewe of Apollo—an LGBT social club originating from nearby New Orleans—developed a sister branch for Baton Rouge. Its annual drag balls were targets of further discrimination. Since then, other organizations have been established, such as the Capital City Alliance. The area has grown a sizeable LGBT community, holding festivals such as Baton Rouge Pride.

=== Religion and spirituality ===
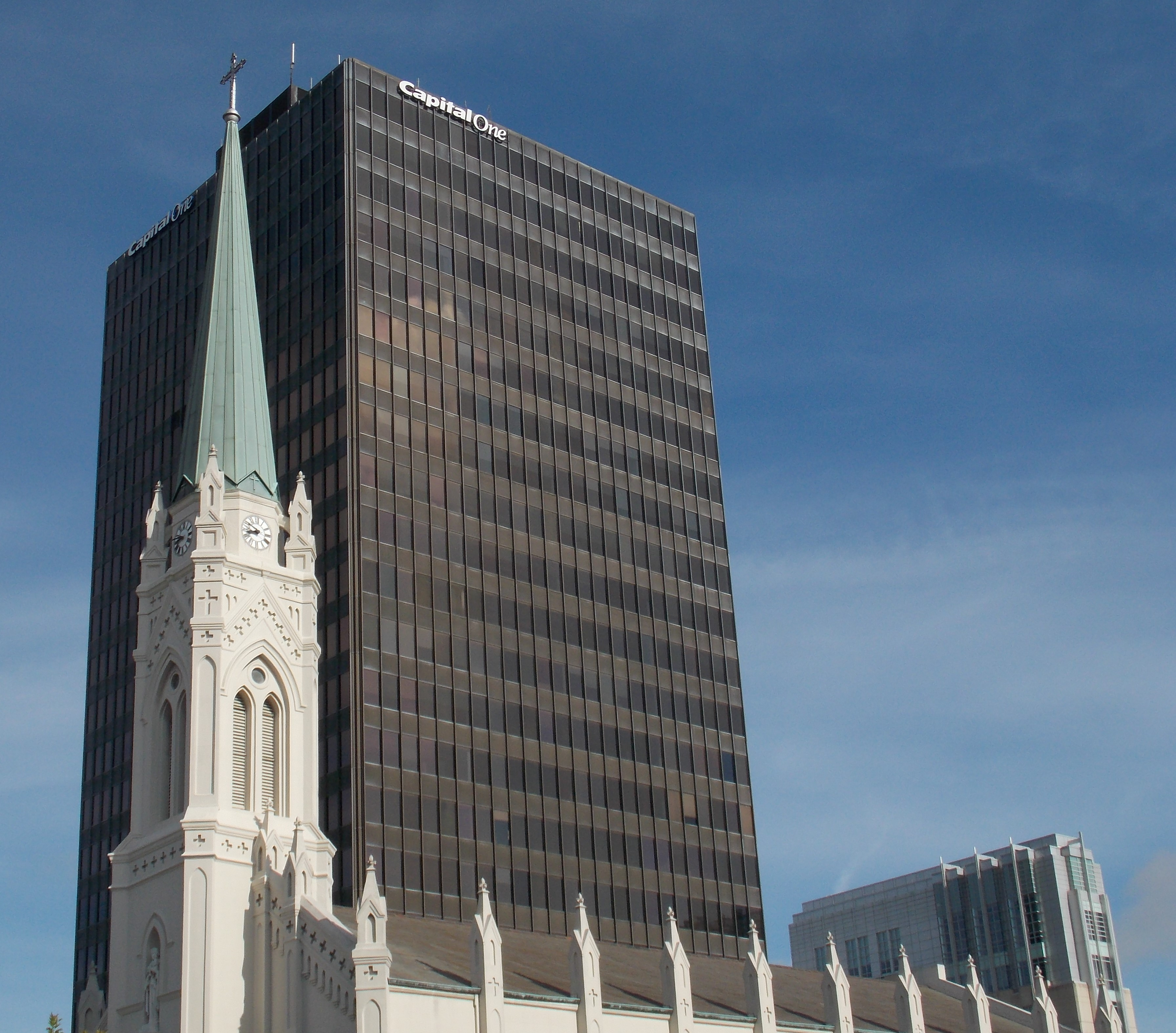
The steeple of St. Joseph Cathedral, cathedral see of the Roman Catholic Diocese of Baton Rouge

Native American religions and Afrodiasporic religions were commonplace alongside Christianity in Baton Rouge's early history. Due to French, Spanish, and British colonization and missionary efforts, in addition to American settlement, Baton Rouge became a predominantly Christian city and metropolitan area. In a 2020 study by the Association of Religion Data Archives, Christianity is the most-practiced religion for the Baton Rouge area, being influenced by Catholicism and Protestantism.

In 2020, ARDA reported there were 61 congregations and 174,410 Catholics within the metropolitan area. The Catholic population is primarily served by the Latin Church's Roman Catholic Diocese of Baton Rouge—a suffragan diocese of the Roman Catholic Metropolitan Archdiocese of New Orleans. The Southern Baptist Convention was the second largest individual Christian denomination with 208 congregations and 91,293 members. The United Methodists had 28,924 members. The National Baptist Convention had 15,532 adherents in 25 churches. Non-denominational Protestants were spread out in 270 churches numbering 102,500.

In a 2019 study by Sperling's BestPlaces, other notable Christian bodies in the area include Anglicans or Episcopalians, Pentecostals, Presbyterians, Latter-Day Saints, and Lutherans. Christians including Jehovah's Witnesses, the Metropolitan Community Church, Christian Unitarians, and the Eastern Orthodox among others collectively made up 14% of the Sperling's study other Christian demographic. Notable Anglican or Episcopalian jurisdictions operating throughout the Greater Baton Rouge area include the Episcopal Diocese of Louisiana aligned with the Protestant Episcopal Church of the United States; and the Reformed Episcopal Diocese of Mid-America and the Anglican Diocese of the Western Gulf Coast aligned with the Anglican Church in North America.

Baton Rouge's Pentecostal communities are mainly affiliated with the Assemblies of God USA and the Church of God in Christ. Presbyterians are mainly members of the Presbyterian Church (USA). In 2020, the Church of God in Christ was the area's largest Pentecostal denomination by membership.

In 2019, the second-largest religion in Baton Rouge and its metropolitan area was Islam. In 2020, there were over six mosques in the Baton Rouge area, primarily affiliated with Sunni Islam. The Nation of Islam also has a presence in the area. The Muslim population has grown out of Middle Eastern immigration and African American Muslim missionary work. The first Islamic private school in Baton Rouge was established in 2019.

In 2019, Orthodox Jews made up 0.2% of Baton Rouge's religious population. 0.6% of the population identified with Eastern faiths, including Buddhism and Hinduism. New religious movements including contemporary paganism have small communities in the area, and a minority practice Haitian Vodou, Louisiana Voodoo, and Hoodoo. In Sperling's 2019 study, 31.9% of the population identified as either spiritual but not religious, agnostic, or atheist.

== Economy ==
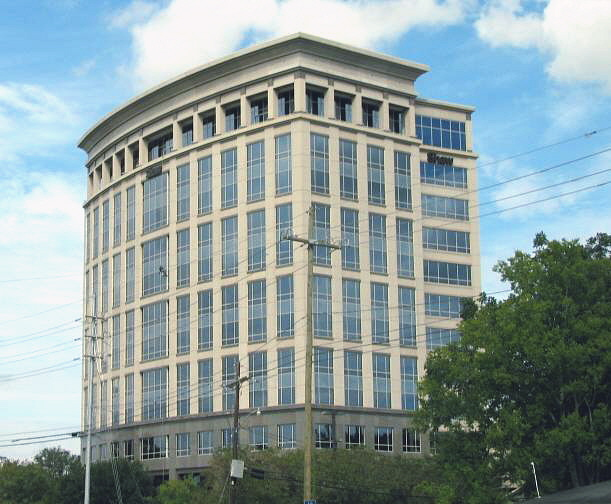
The former CB&I local office on Essen Lane, a commercial office corridor

Baton Rouge enjoys a strong economy that has helped the city be ranked as one of the "Top 10 Places for Young Adults" in 2010 by portfolio.com and one of the top 20 cities in North America for economic strength by the Brookings Institution. In 2009, the city was ranked by CNN as the 9th-best place in the country to start a new business. Lamar Advertising Company has its headquarters in Baton Rouge. Other notable companies headquartered in the city include BBQGuys, Marucci Sports, Piccadilly Restaurants, and Raising Cane's Chicken Fingers. Notable corporations which have established offices or distribution centers in the Baton Rouge area have included Amazon in 2021, and Microsoft. Chicago Bridge & Iron Company had an office in Baton Rouge before being sold in 2017. In 2023, Aldi established a presence in Baton Rouge.

Baton Rouge is the farthest inland port on the Mississippi River that can accommodate ocean-going tankers and cargo carriers. The ships transfer their cargo (grain, oil, cars, containers) at Baton Rouge onto rails and pipelines (to travel east–west) or barges (to travel north). Deep-draft vessels cannot pass the Old Huey Long Bridge because the clearance is insufficient. In addition, the river depth decreases significantly just to the north, near Port Hudson.

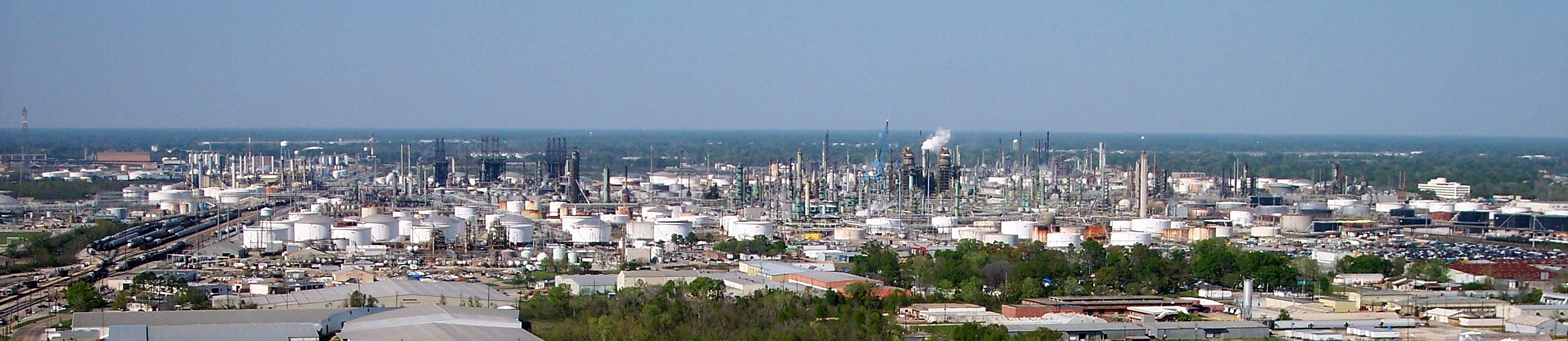
The ExxonMobil oil refinery seen from the capitol tower

Baton Rouge's largest industry is petrochemical production and manufacturing. ExxonMobil's Baton Rouge Refinery complex is the fifth-largest oil refinery in the country; it is the world's tenth largest. Baton Rouge also has rail, highway, pipeline, and deep-water access. Dow Chemical Company has a large plant in Iberville Parish near Plaquemine, 17 miles (27 km) south of Baton Rouge. Shaw Construction, Turner, and Harmony all started with performing construction work at these plants.

In addition to being the state capital and parish seat, the city is the home of Louisiana State University, which employs over 5,000 academic staff. One of the largest single employers in Baton Rouge is the state government, which consolidated all branches of state government downtown at the Capitol Park complex.

The city has a substantial medical research and clinical presence. Research hospitals have included Our Lady of the Lake, Our Lady of the Lake Children's Hospital (affiliated with St. Jude Children's Research Hospital), Mary Bird Perkins Cancer Center, and Earl K. Long (closed 2013). Together with an emerging medical corridor at Essen Lane, Summa Avenue and Bluebonnet Boulevard, Baton Rouge is developing a medical district expected to be similar to the Texas Medical Center. LSU and Tulane University have both announced plans to construct satellite medical campuses in Baton Rouge to partner with Our Lady of the Lake Medical Center and Baton Rouge General Medical Center, respectively.

Southeastern Louisiana University and Franciscan Missionaries of Our Lady University both have nursing schools in the medical district off Essen Lane. Louisiana State University's Pennington Biomedical Research Center, which conducts clinical and biological research, also contributes to research-related employment in the area around the Baton Rouge medical district.

The film industry in Louisiana has expanded dramatically since the beginning of the 21st century, aided by generous tax incentives adopted by the state in 2002. In September 2013, the Baton Rouge Film Commission reported that the industry had brought more than $90 million into the local economy in 2013. Baton Rouge's largest production facility is the Celtic Media Centre, opened in 2006 by a local group in collaboration with Raleigh Studios of Los Angeles. Raleigh dropped its involvement in 2014.

== Culture and arts ==
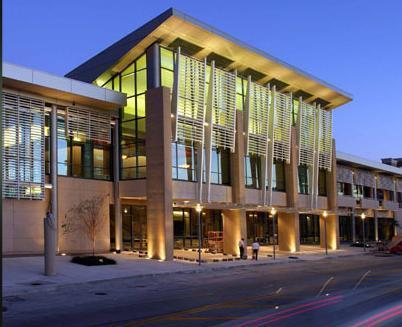
Raising Cane's Baton Rouge River Center in Downtown

Baton Rouge is a culturally distinct area of Louisiana, where Cajun and Creole Catholic culture from Greater New Orleans and Acadiana is syncretized with the African American Baptist culture of the Florida Parishes and South Mississippi. The city of Baton Rouge is a "college town" with Baton Rouge Community College, Louisiana State University, Franciscan Missionaries of Our Lady University, and Southern University located throughout the city limits; the students of Louisiana State University alone make up 20% of the city population. In a sizable international population of over 11,300 as of 2008, the largest groups were people of Hispanic and Latino, or Vietnamese descent. This contributes to Baton Rouge's unique culture and diversity.

=== Arts and theater ===
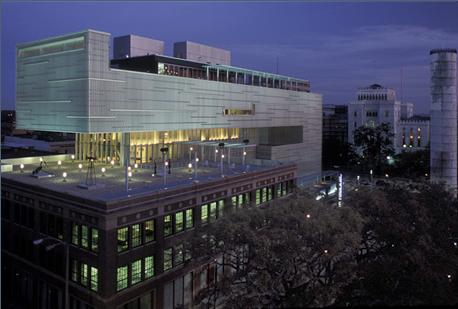
Shaw Center for the Arts in Downtown

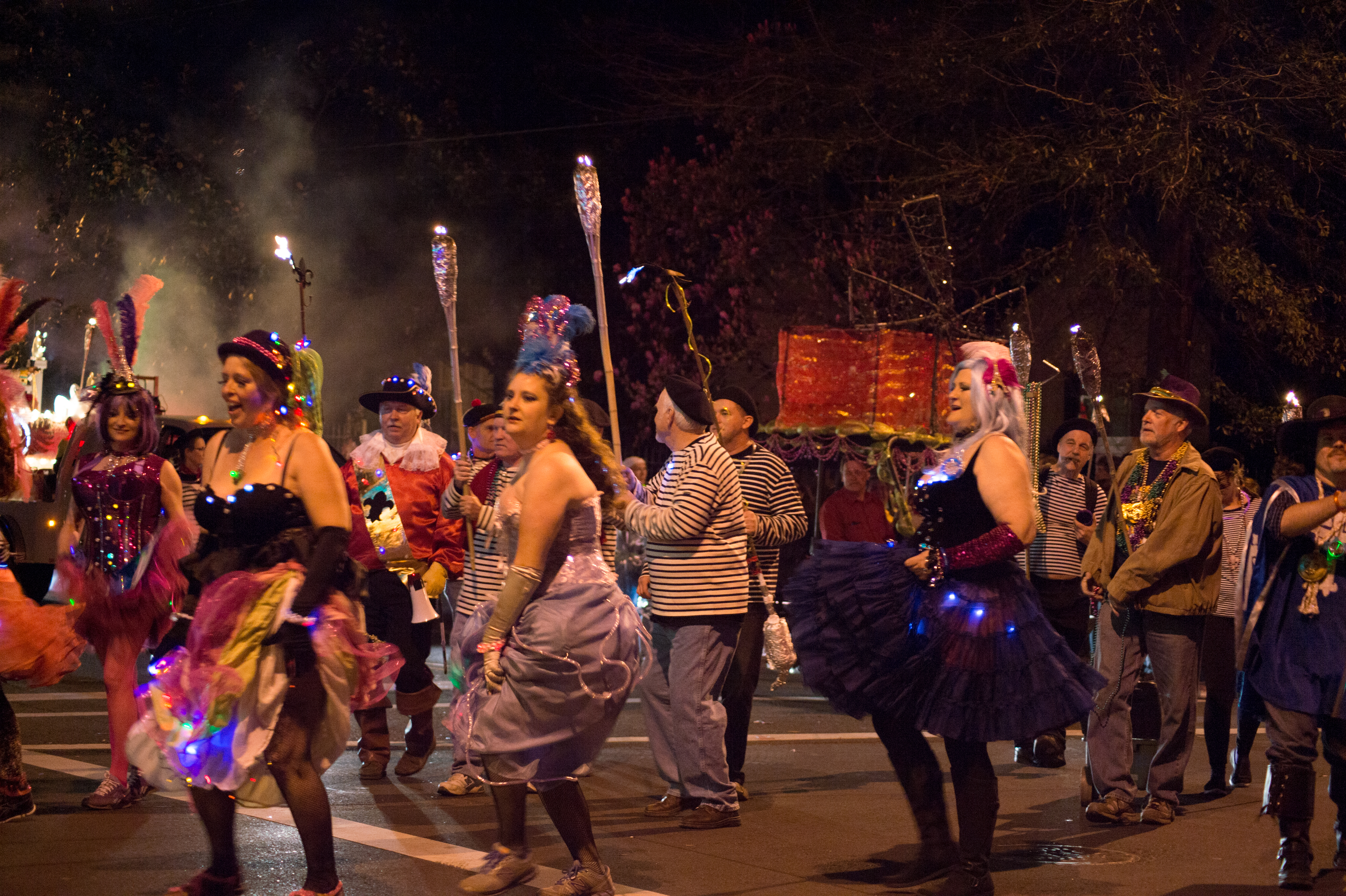
Southdowns Mardi Gras parade, 2014

Baton Rouge has an expanding visual arts scene, which is centered downtown. Professional performing arts organizations include Theatre Baton Rouge, the Baton Rouge Symphony Orchestra, Baton Rouge Ballet Theatre, Opera Louisiane and Playmakers—a professional Children's Theatre. This increasing collection of venues includes the Shaw Center for the Arts. Opened in 2005, the facility houses the Brunner Gallery, LSU Museum of Art; the Manship Theatre; a contemporary art gallery; traveling exhibits; and several eateries. Another prominent facility is the Louisiana Art and Science Museum, which contains the Irene W. Pennington Planetarium, traveling art exhibits, space displays, and an ancient Egyptian section. Several smaller art galleries, including the Baton Rouge Gallery, offering a range of local art, are scattered throughout the city.

The city has several designated arts and cultural districts, the most prominent of which are the Mid-City Cultural District and the Perkins Road Arts District. These districts provide tax incentives, mostly in the form of exempting state tax on purchases, to promote cultural activity in these areas. Located in a Qualified Census Tract the North Baton Rouge community of Scotlandville was designated a Cultural District in 2020.

A performing arts scene is emerging. LSU's Swine Palace is the foremost theatre company in the city, largely made up of students of LSU's MFA acting program, as well as professional actors and stage managers. A group of physical theatre and circus artists from LSU traveled to Edinburgh, Scotland, in summer 2012 to perform Dante in what has become the world's largest Fringe Festival. The show ran in Baton Rouge before going to Fringe, and featured movement, acrobatics, and aerial silk.

Theatre Baton Rouge offers a diverse selection of live theatre performances. Opera Louisiane is Baton Rouge's only professional opera company. The Baton Rouge Ballet Theatre is Baton Rouge's professional ballet company. The Nutcracker– A Tale from the Bayou sets the familiar holiday classic in 19th-century Louisiana and has become a Baton Rouge holiday tradition. A Tale from the Bayou features professional dancers, a live orchestra, and more than 300 area children.

Baton Rouge is also home to Forward Arts, a youth writing organization. Forward Arts won the international youth poetry slam, Brave New Voices in 2017, and was the first team from the Southern United States to ever win the competition. Forward Arts is the only youth spoken-word organization in the state of Louisiana. It was founded by Dr. Anna West in 2005, and first housed in the Big Buddy Program.

Baton Rouge is also home to Of Moving Colors Productions, the premier contemporary dance company in the city known for hosting internationally established choreographers and actively engaging with the local community.

Performing venues include the Baton Rouge River Center, Baton Rouge River Center Theatre for the Performing Arts, which seats about 1,900; the Manship Theatre, which is located in the Shaw Center for the Arts and seats 350; and the Reilly Theater, which is home to Swine Palace, a nonprofit professional theater company associated with the Louisiana State University Department of Theatre.

The Baton Rouge Symphony Orchestra has operated since 1947 and currently performs at the River Center Music Hall downtown. Today, it presents more than 60 concerts annually, directed by Timothy Muffitt and David Torns. The BRSO's educational component, the Louisiana Youth Orchestra, made its debut in 1984. It includes almost 180 musicians under the age of 20.

=== Miss USA pageants ===
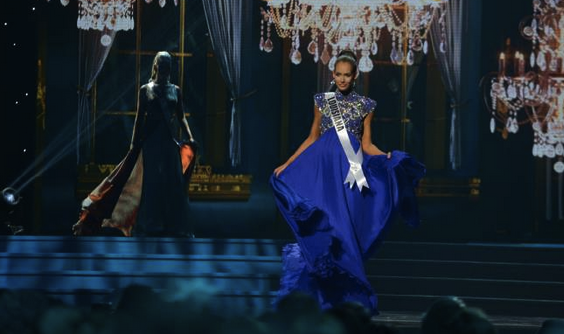
Miss Louisiana USA Brittany Guidry, Miss USA 2014, Preliminary Evening Gown Competition

Baton Rouge was chosen to host the Miss USA 2014 Pageant. It took over downtown Baton Rouge as Nia Sanchez, Miss Nevada USA, took home the crown, with Miss Louisiana USA Brittany Guidry coming in fourth. Veteran pageant host Giuliana Rancic and MSNBC news anchor Thomas Roberts introduced the 51 contestants; there were 20 semifinalists. Cosmo weighed in on the contest, complimenting Guidry. Celebrity judges included actress Rumer Willis, NBA star Karl Malone, singer Lance Bass, and actor Ian Ziering. Baton Rouge hosted Miss USA 2015 again on July 12, 2015, which was won by actress and Miss Oklahoma USA Olivia Jordan. Baton Rouge was also the site of the 2005 Miss Teen USA Pageant.

=== Tourism and recreation ===
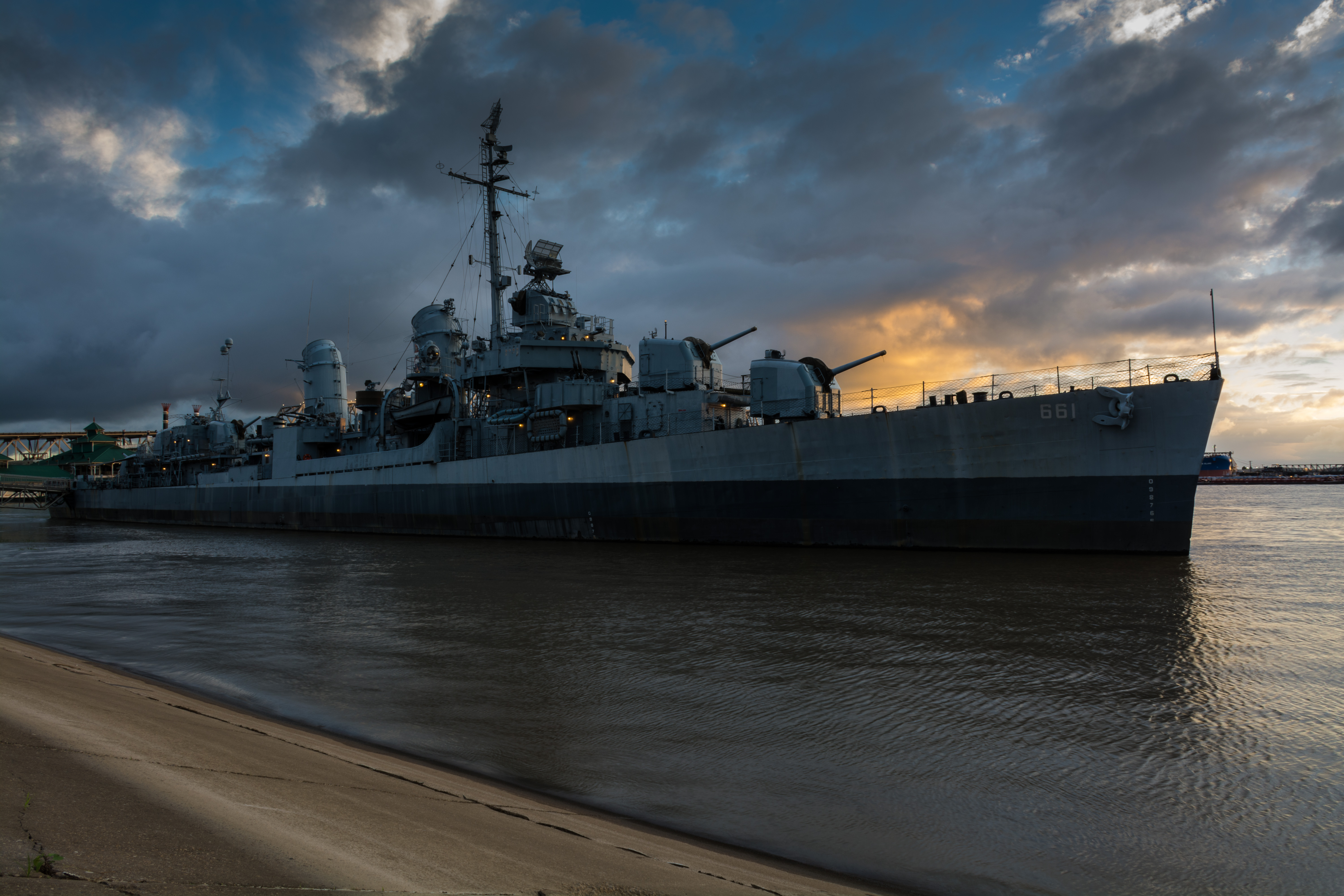
USS Kidd, located downtown on the river, is part of the Louisiana Naval Museum.

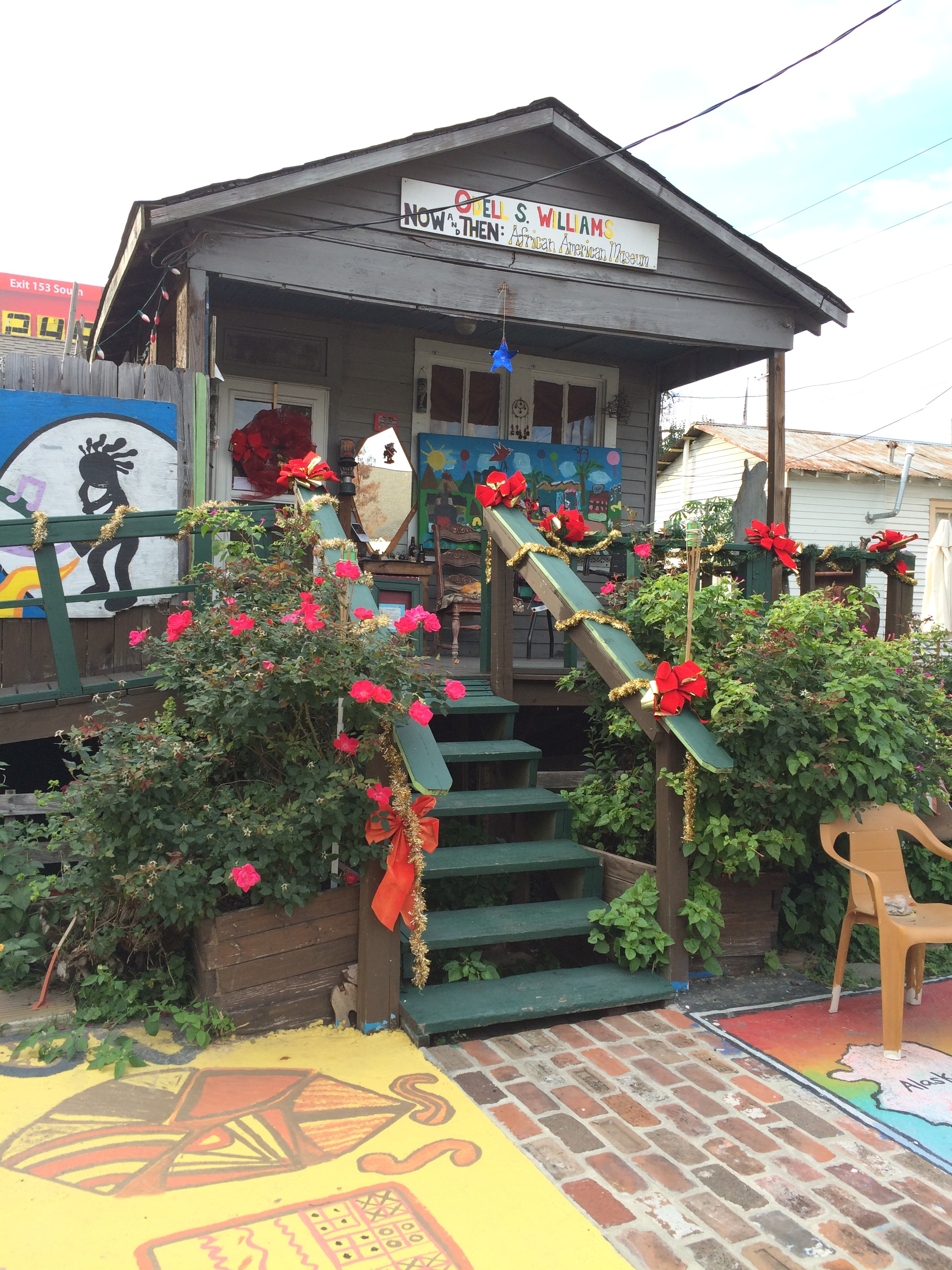
The Now And Then African-American Museum

Baton Rouge's many architectural points of interest range from antebellum to modern. The neo-gothic Old Louisiana State Capitol was built in the 1850s as the first statehouse in Baton Rouge. It was later replaced by the 450-ft-tall, art deco New Louisiana State Capitol, the tallest building in the South when it was completed. Several plantation homes in the area, such as Magnolia Mound Plantation House, Myrtles Plantation, and Nottoway Plantation, showcase antebellum-era architecture.

Louisiana State University has more than 250 buildings in Italian Renaissance style, one of the nation's largest college stadiums, and many live oaks. The downtown has several examples of modern and contemporary buildings, including the Capitol Park Museum.

A number of structures, including the Baton Rouge River Center, Louisiana State Library, LSU Student Union, Louisiana Naval Museum, Bluebonnet Swamp Interpretive Center, Louisiana Arts and Sciences Center, Louisiana State Archive and Research Library, and the Pennington Biomedical Research Center, were designed by local architect John Desmond. The Pentagon Barracks Museum and Visitors Center is within the barracks complex and the Yazoo and Mississippi Valley Railroad Company Depot houses the Louisiana Art and Science Museum.

Museums around town offer a variety of genres. The Capitol Park Museum and the Old Louisiana State Capitol Museum display information on state history and have many interactive exhibits. The Shaw Center for the Arts and the Louisiana Art and Science Museum showcase varied arts. LASM also includes science exhibits and a planetarium. Other museums include the LSU Museum of Natural Science and the USS Kidd. The Odell S. Williams Now And Then African-American Museum chronicles the progression and growth of African-Americans.

The Greater Baton Rouge State Fair is an annual one-week attraction held every mid-fall. The fair began in 1965 and has been under the management of the Baton Rouge Jaycee organization since 1985. In 2021, the fair set an attendance record with over 100,000 attendees.

Other attractions include the Mall of Louisiana and Perkins Rowe, amusement parks of Dixie Landin'/Blue Bayou, and dining at the Louisiana-cuisine restaurants.

== Sports ==
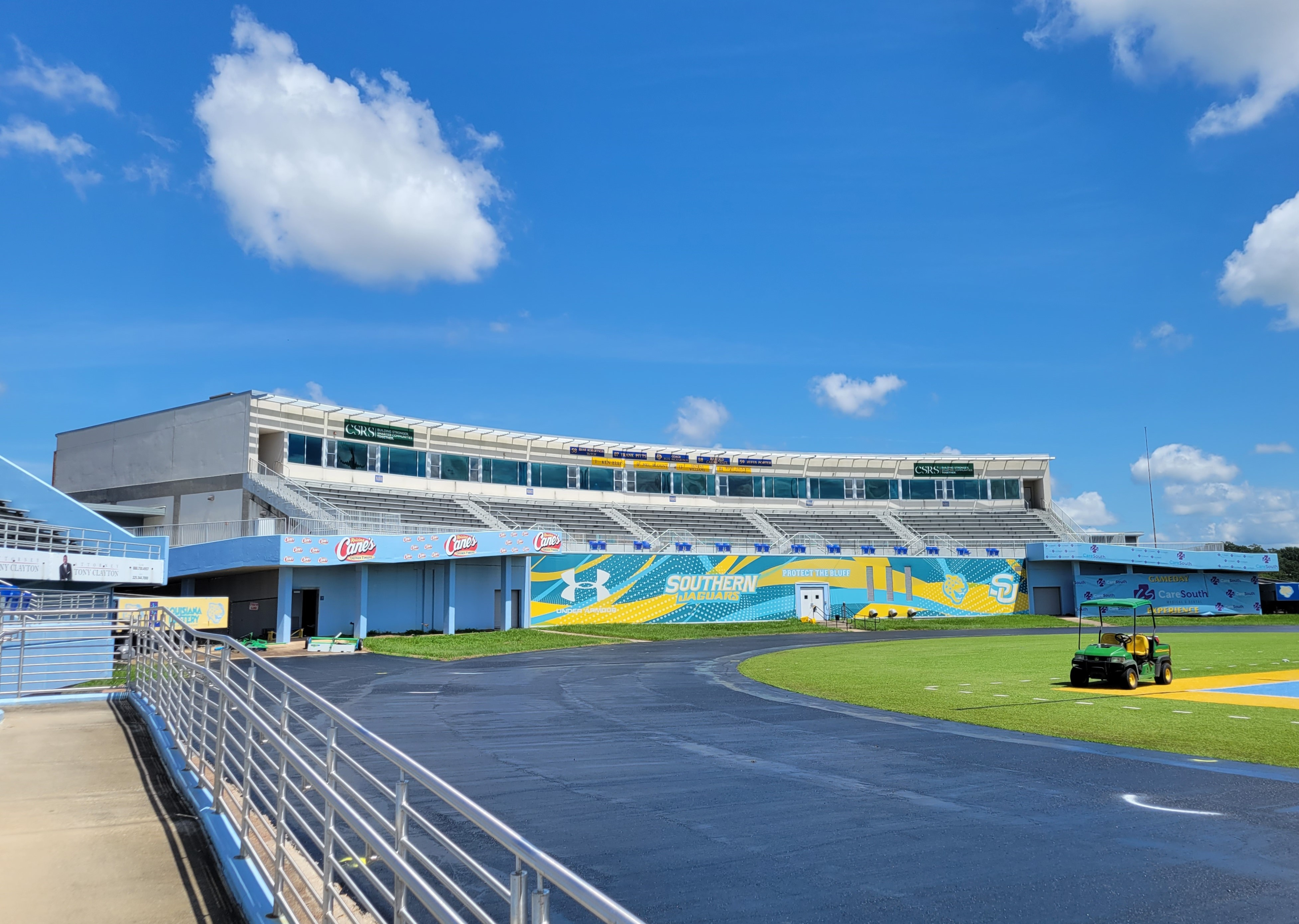
A. W. Mumford Stadium of Southern University

College sports play a major role in the culture of Baton Rouge. The LSU Tigers and the Southern University Jaguars are NCAA Division I athletic programs with the LSU Tigers football and Southern Jaguars football teams being the local college American football teams. College baseball, basketball, and gymnastics are also popular.

Much of the city's sport's attention is focused on the professional teams in Greater New Orleans. Baton Rouge has had multiple minor-league baseball teams (the Baton Rouge Red Sticks), soccer teams (Baton Rouge Bombers), indoor football teams, a basketball team, and a hockey team (Baton Rouge Kingfish).

Following a successful round of exhibition games, the Federal Prospects Hockey League announced that Baton Rouge would be awarded a franchise, beginning play in 2023. The Baton Rouge Zydeco play their home games at the River Center.

The city is home to many alternative or less known leagues. For Australian rules football, the city has the Baton Rouge Tigers which began play in 2004 and competes in the USAFL. The Baton Rouge Rugby Football Club began playing in 1977 and has won numerous conference championships. Currently, the team competes in the Deep South Rugby Football Union. Baton Rouge is also home to Red Stick Roller Derby, a WFTDA Division 3 roller derby league.

The Baton Rouge Rougarou, a college summer league baseball team in the Texas Collegiate League play home games at Pete Goldsby Field in the north of the city.

Soccer for the city currently consists of Louisiana Parish AC of USL League Two. The team plays at various home fields including LSU recreation fields on campus and BREC Memorial Stadium near the Rougarou's home field.

== Parks and recreation ==
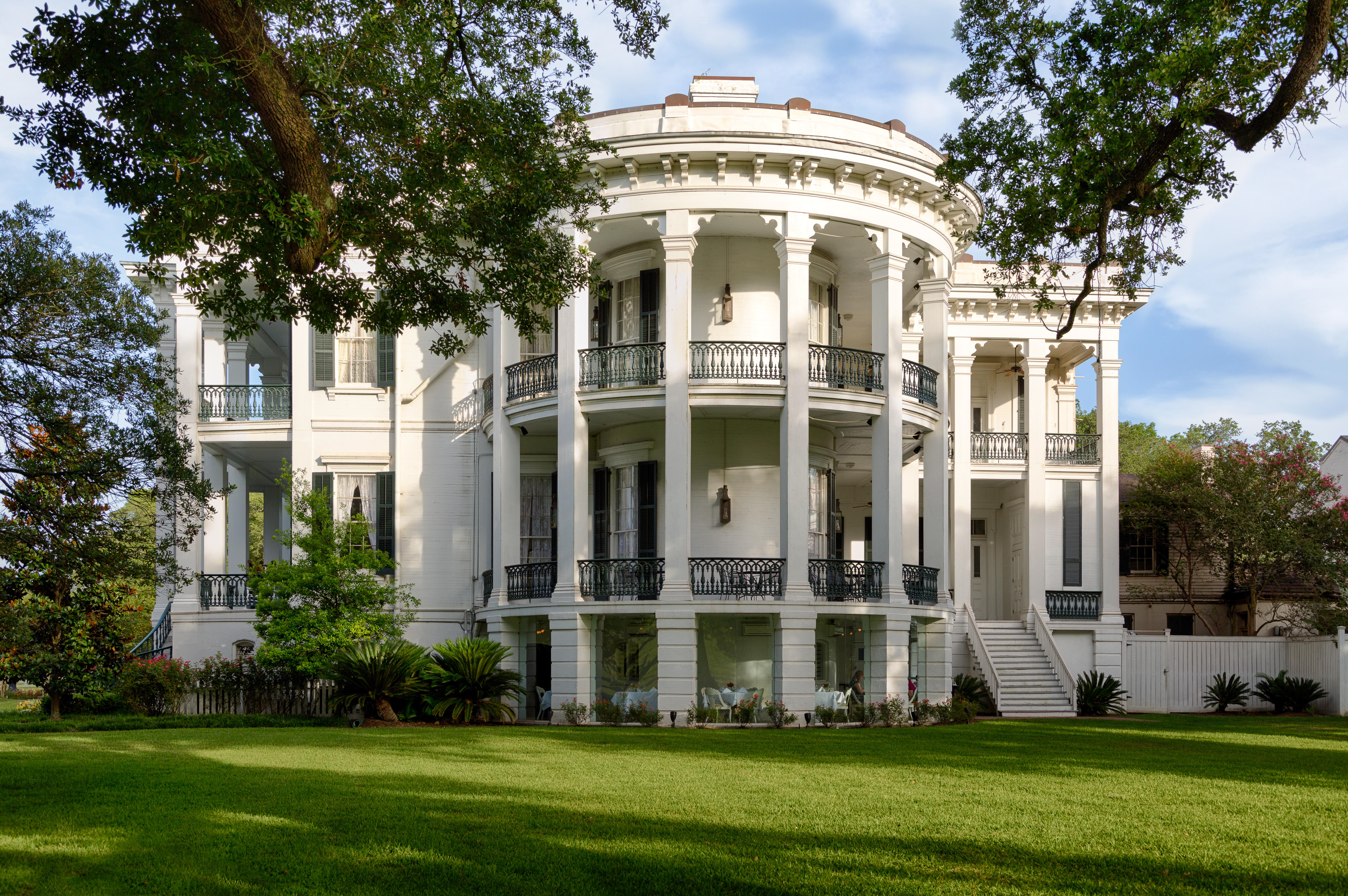
Nottoway Plantation located near White Castle, 26 miles (42 km) south of Baton Rouge

Baton Rouge has an extensive park collection presided over by the Recreation and Park Commission for the Parish of East Baton Rouge (BREC). The largest park is City Park near the Louisiana State University flagship campus. Another notable park is Highland Road Community Park, spanning over 144 acres (58 ha). The Baton Rouge Zoo is also run through BREC and includes over 1,800 species.

=== National protected areas ===
The city is home to 7 national protected areas, and at least 15 places on the National Register of Historic Places: Atchafalaya National Heritage Area, Baton Rouge National Cemetery, Independence Park Botanic Gardens, Laurens Henry Cohn Sr. Memorial Plant Arboretum, LSU Hilltop Arboretum, Magnolia Cemetery, and Port Hudson National Cemetery.

Among its protected areas, the Atchafalaya National Heritage Area extends the length of the Atchafalaya Basin from the area of Ferriday in the north to the river's mouth beyond Morgan City; the designation provides a framework for the promotion and interpretation of the area's cultural and historic character, and the preservation of the natural and built environment. The Cohn Arboretum previously served as the site for the Cohn family's home; its land was donated in 1965 and the arboretum opened in 1980. LSU's arboretum was originally developed in 1929 and donated to the university in 1981.

== Government ==
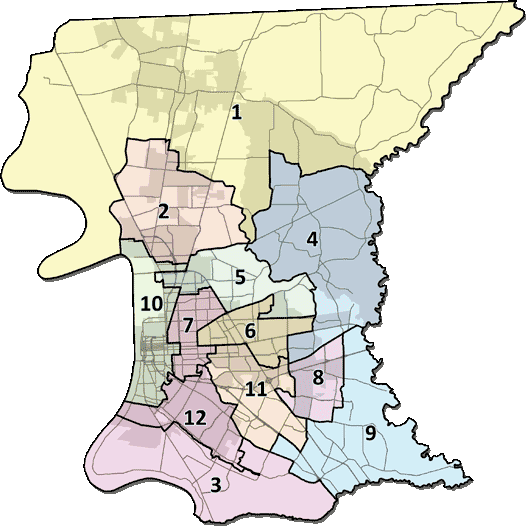
A map of East Baton Rouge Parish districts

The city of Baton Rouge and the Parish of East Baton Rouge have been run by a consolidated government since 1947. It combined the Baton Rouge municipal government with the rural areas of the parish, allowing people outside the limits of the city of Baton Rouge to use city services. Though the city and parish have a consolidated government, this differs slightly from a traditional consolidated city-county (Note: Because the Louisiana uses parishes, the equivalent of a county in other states, in the state this form of government is called a "consolidated city-parish".) government.

The cities of Zachary, Baker, Central, and St. George operate their own city governments within East Baton Rouge Parish. Under this system, Baton Rouge has the uncommon office of "mayor-president", which consolidates the executive offices of "mayor of Baton Rouge" and "president of East Baton Rouge Parish". Though Zachary, Baker, and Central each have their own mayors, citizens living in these municipalities are still a part of the constituency who can vote and run in elections for mayor-president and metropolitan council.

The mayor-president's duties include setting the agenda for the government and managing the government's day-to-day functions. They are also responsible for supervising departments, as well as appointing the department heads. The mayor does not set the city's public policy because that is the Metropolitan Council's role, but the mayor-president does have some influence on the policy through appointments and relationships with council members.

The current mayor-president of Baton Rouge is Republican Sid Edwards.

=== Metropolitan council ===
A map of Baton Rouge City Council partisanship

When the city and parish combined government, the city and parish councils consolidated to form the East Baton Rouge Parish Metropolitan Council. The Metropolitan Council is the legislative branch of the Baton Rouge government. Its 12 district council members are elected from single-member districts. They elect from among themselves the mayor-president pro tempore. The mayor-president pro tempore presides over the council's meetings and assumes the role of the mayor-president if the mayor-president is unable to serve. The council members serve four-year terms and can hold office for three terms.

In the late 1960s, Joe Delpit—a local African American businessman owning and operating the Chicken Shack—was elected as the first black council member in Baton Rouge. As in other cities of Louisiana and the South, African Americans had been largely disenfranchised for decades into the 20th century. The Chicken Shack, with multiple locations, in 2015 was reported as the oldest continually operating business in Baton Rouge.

The Metropolitan Council's main responsibilities are setting the policy for the government, voting on legislation, and approving the city's budget. The council makes policies for the following: the city and parish general funds, all districts created by the council, the Greater Baton Rouge Airport District, the Public Transportation Commission, the East Baton Rouge Parish Sewerage Control Commission and the Greater Baton Rouge Parking Authority.

District	Name	Party
1	Brandon Noel, Mayor–Pro Tempore	Rep
2	Anthony Kenney	Dem
3	Rowdy Gaudet	Rep
4	Aaron Moak	Rep
5	Darryl Hurst	Dem
6	Cleve Dunn Jr.	Dem
7	Twahna P. Harris	Dem
8	Denise Amoroso	Rep
9	Dwight Hudson	Rep
10	Carolyn Coleman	Dem
11	Laurie Adams	Rep
12	Jennifer Racca	Rep

== Education ==
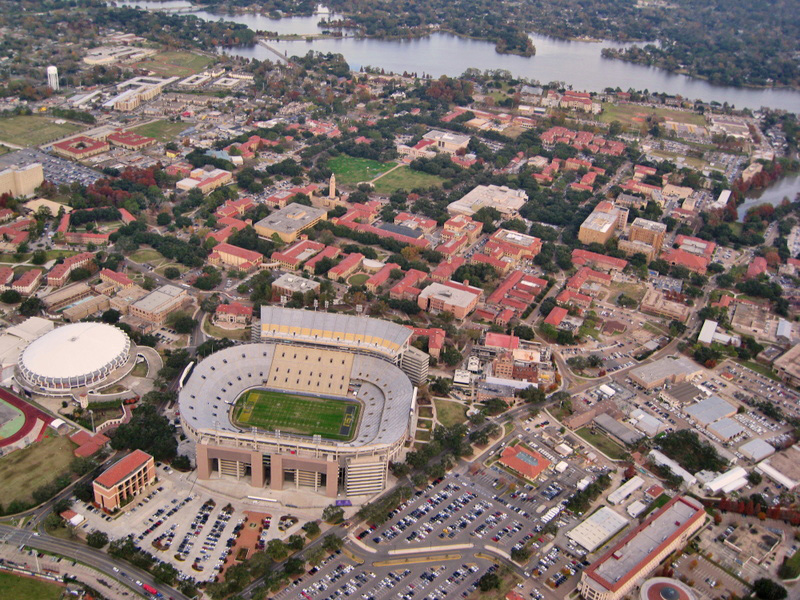
An aerial view of Louisiana State University

Baton Rouge is home to many universities. Louisiana State University and Agricultural and Mechanical College, generally known as Louisiana State University or LSU, is a public university that is the flagship campus of the Louisiana State University System. LSU is Louisiana's largest university, with over 30,000 students and 1,300 full-time faculty members. Southern University and A&M College, generally known as Southern University or SU, is the flagship institution of the Southern University System, the nation's only historically black land-grant university system. SU is the largest HBCU and second-oldest public university in Louisiana.

Virginia College opened in October 2010 and offers students training in areas such as cosmetology, business, health, and medical billing. Franciscan Missionaries of Our Lady University is an independent Catholic institution also in the Baton Rouge medical district that has programs in nursing, health sciences, humanities, behavioral sciences, and arts and sciences. It has an associated hospital, Our Lady of the Lake Regional Medical Center. Tulane University planned to open a satellite medical school at Baton Rouge General's Mid City Campus in 2011.

Southeastern Louisiana University School of Nursing is located in the medical district on Essen Lane in Baton Rouge. Southeastern offers traditional baccalaureate and master's degree programs, as well as LPN and RN to BSN articulation. Baton Rouge Community College is an open-admission, two-year post-secondary public community college, established on June 28, 1995. The college settled into a permanent location in 1998. The college's enrollment is more than 8,000 students. The Pennington Biomedical Research Center houses 48 laboratories and 19 core research facilities.

=== Primary and secondary schools ===
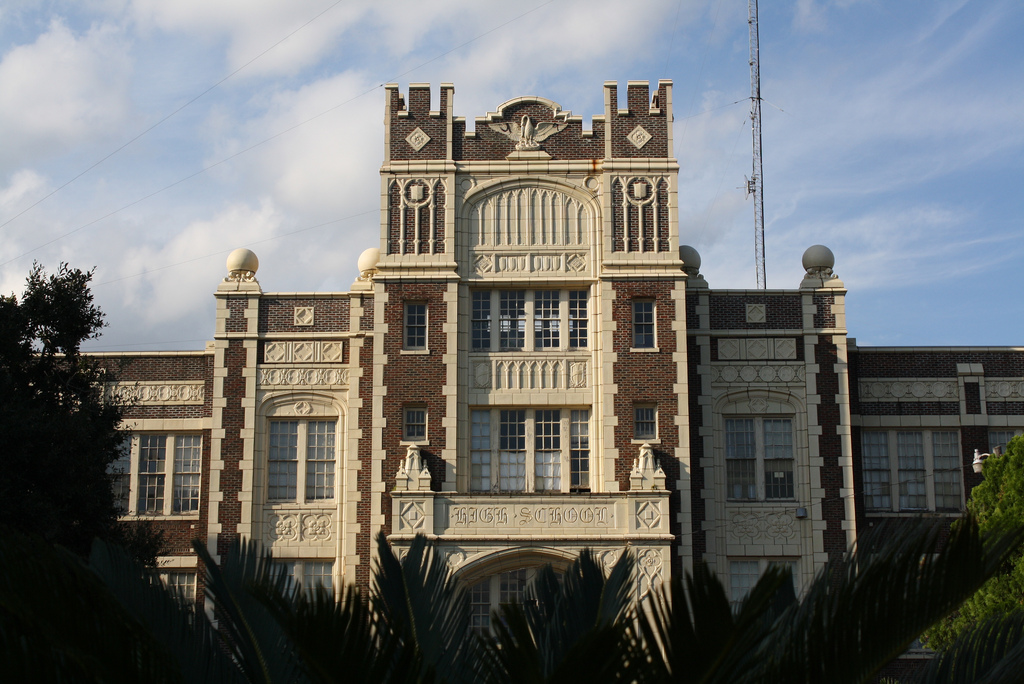
Baton Rouge High School

East Baton Rouge Parish Public Schools operates primary and secondary schools serving the city. The city of Baton Rouge is also home to 27 charter schools with a total enrollment of an estimated 11,000 students as of 2020. One of the latest includes the Mentorship Academy in downtown Baton Rouge, which leverages its location downtown to establish internship opportunities with local businesses as well as provide a high-tech classroom environment to focus on a digital animation curriculum.

The East Baton Rouge Parish School System is the second-largest public school system in the state and contains nine U.S. Blue Ribbon schools and a nationally renowned Magnet program. The school system serves more than 42,850 students and with the help of 6,250 teachers and faculty, the district has shown growth and increase in its District Performance Score. The East Baton Rouge Parish Public Schools serve East Baton Rouge Parish and has 90 schools with 56 elementary schools, 16 middle schools, and 18 high schools.

=== Libraries ===
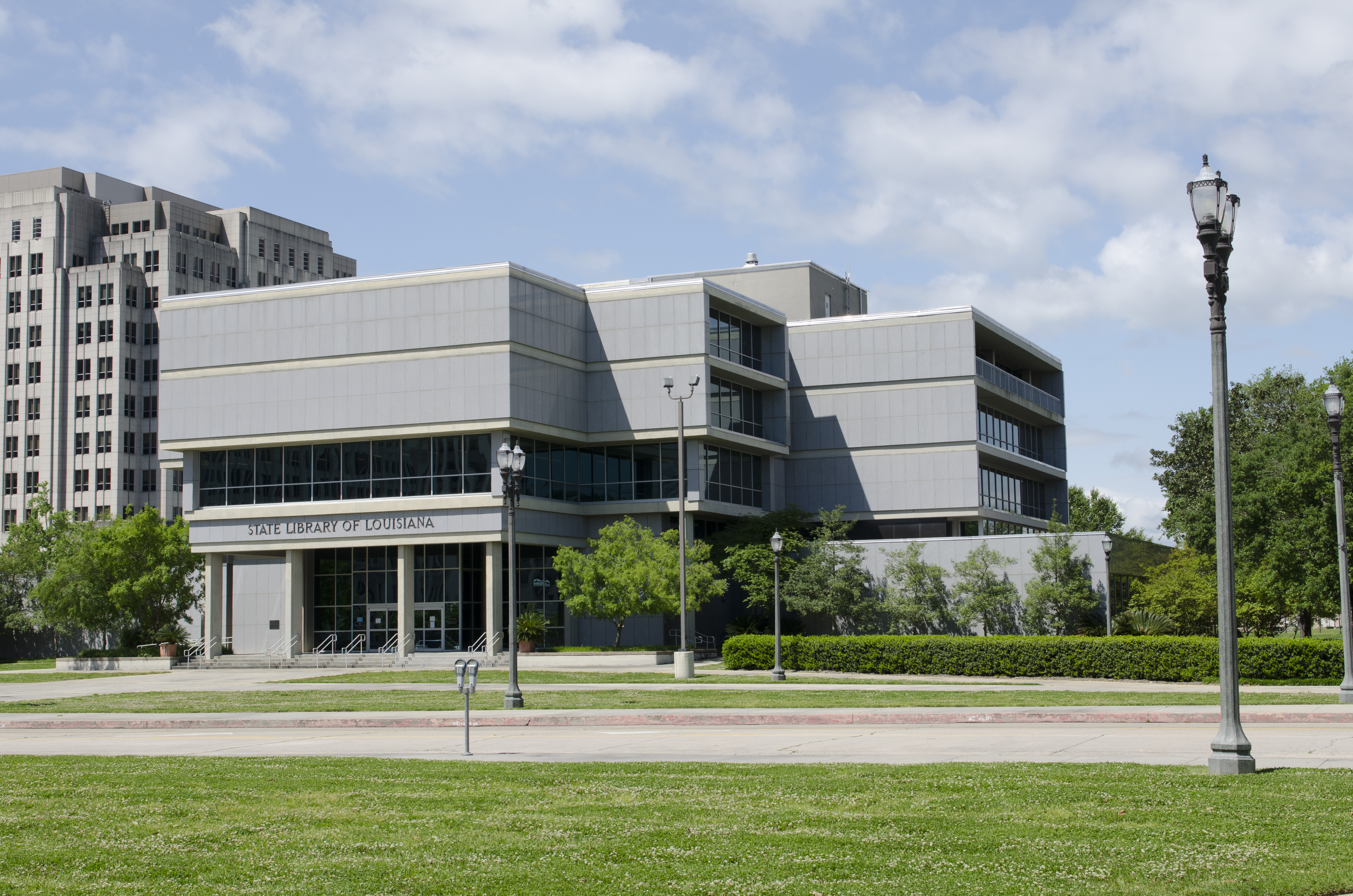
State Library of Louisiana

The State Library of Louisiana is in Baton Rouge. The Louisiana Legislature created the Louisiana Library Commission in 1920. This later became the State Library of Louisiana. The State Library provides Louisiana residents with millions of items with its collections, electronic resources, and the statewide network for lending.

The East Baton Rouge Parish Library System has 15 local libraries with one main library and 14 community libraries. The main library at Goodwood houses genealogy and local history archives. The library system is an entity of the city-parish government. The system has been in operation since 1939. It is governed by the EBR Parish government and directed by the Library Board of Control. The Baton Rouge Metropolitan Council appoints the seven-member board and then the board appoints a director. According to its website, all branches are open seven days a week to assist the public with reference and information and computer access.

The Louisiana State Archives' Main Research Library is located in Baton Rouge, as well. It houses general history books, census indices, immigration schedules, church records, and family histories. The library also has a computerized database of more than two million names that has various information about these people including census, marriage, and social security filing information.

Louisiana State University and the Louisiana State University Law Center have libraries on their respective Baton Rouge campuses. Southern University and A&M College and the Southern University Law Center also have libraries on their respective Baton Rouge campuses.

== Media ==
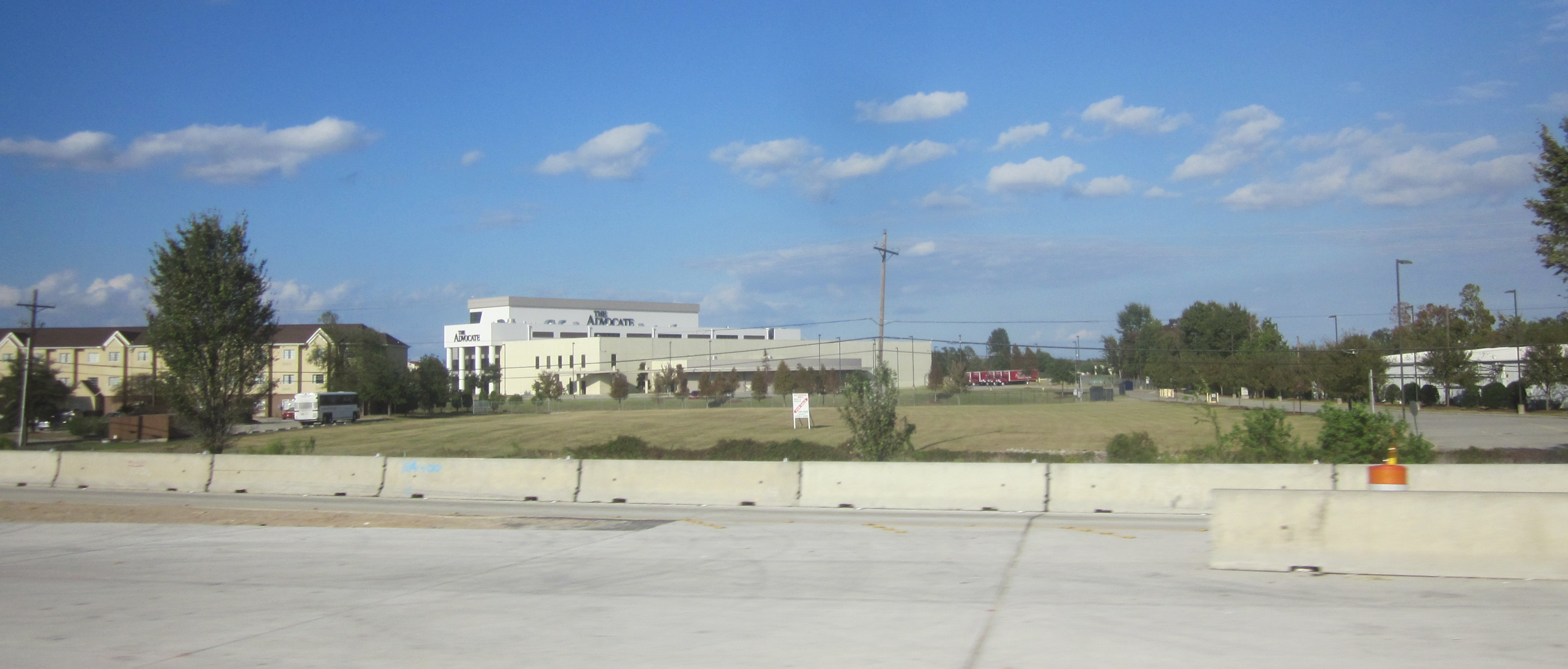
The Advocate office

The major daily newspaper for the Greater Baton Rouge metropolitan area is The Advocate, publishing since 1925. Until 1991, Baton Rouge also had an evening newspaper, The State-Times—at that time, the morning paper was known as The Morning Advocate. Other publications include: Baton Rouge Parents Magazine, Pink & Blue Magazine, The Daily Reveille, The Southern Review, 225 magazine, DIG, Greater Baton Rouge Business Report, inRegister magazine, 10/12 magazine, Country Roads magazine, 225Alive, Healthcare Journal of Baton Rouge, Southern University Digest, and The South Baton Rouge Journal.

Other newspapers in East Baton Rouge Parish include the Central City News and The Zachary Post. The Greater Baton Rouge area is well served by television and radio. The market is the 95th-largest designated market area in the U.S. Major television network affiliates serving the area include:

- 2 WBRZ-TV (ABC)
- 9 WAFB (CBS)
- 20 KZUP-CD (Independent)
- 21 WBRL-CD (The CW)
- 27 WLPB (PBS/LPB)
- 30 WLFT-CD (Independent)
- 33 WVLA (NBC)
- 36 KBTR-CD (This TV)
- 39 WBXH-CD (My Network TV)
- 44 WGMB (Fox)

Baton Rouge also offer local government-access television-only channels on Cox Cable channel 21.

== Infrastructure ==
=== Health and medicine ===
Baton Rouge is served by several hospitals and clinics:

- Baton Rouge General Medical Center – Mid-City Campus
- Baton Rouge General Medical Center – Bluebonnet Campus
- HealthSouth Rehabilitation Hospital
- Our Lady of the Lake Regional Medical Center
- Ochsner Medical Center
- Our Lady of the Lake Children's Hospital
- Ochsner Medical Complex – The Grove

The city-parish government also operates an Emergency Medical Services department.

=== Communication ===
Most of the Baton Rouge area's high-speed internet, broadband, and fiber optic communications are provided by REV (formerly EATEL), AT&T Inc., Charter Communications, or Cox Communications. In 2006, Cox Communications linked its Lafayette, Baton Rouge, and New Orleans markets with fiber-optic infrastructure. Other providers soon followed suit, and fiber optics have thus far proven reliable in all hurricanes since they were installed, even when mobile and broadband services are disrupted during storms. In 2001, the Supermike computer at Louisiana State University was ranked as the number-one computer cluster in the world, and remains one of the top 500 computing sites in the world.

== Military installations ==
Baton Rouge is home station to the Louisiana Army National Guard 769th Engineer Battalion, which had units deployed to Iraq and Afghanistan. The armory near LSU has three company-sized units: 769th HSC (headquarters support company); 769th FSC (forward support company); and the 927th Sapper Company. Other units of the battalion are located at Napoleonville (928th Sapper Company); Baker, Louisiana (926th MAC mobility augmentation company); and Gonzales, Louisiana (922nd Horizontal Construction Company).

The 769th Engineer Battalion is part of the 225th Engineer Brigade, headquartered in Pineville, Louisiana, at Louisiana National Guard Training Center Pineville. Four engineer battalions and an independent bridging company are in the 225th Engineer Brigade, making it the largest engineer group in the US Army Corps of Engineers.

Baton Rouge is also home to 3rd Battalion, 23rd Marine Regiment (3/23), a reserve infantry battalion in the United States Marine Corps located throughout the Midwestern United States consisting of about 800 marines and sailors. The battalion was first formed in 1943 for service in the Pacific Theater of Operations during World War II, taking part in a number of significant battles including those at Saipan and Iwo Jima before being deactivated at the end of the war. In the early 1960s, the unit was reactivated as a reserve battalion. The battalion is headquartered in Saint Louis, Missouri, with outlying units throughout the Midwestern United States. 3/23 falls under the command of the 23rd Marine Regiment and the 4th Marine Division.

== Transportation ==
=== Highways and roads ===
==== Interstates ====
Baton Rouge has three interstate highways: I-10, I-12 (Republic of West Florida Parkway), and I-110 (Martin Luther King Jr. Expressway).

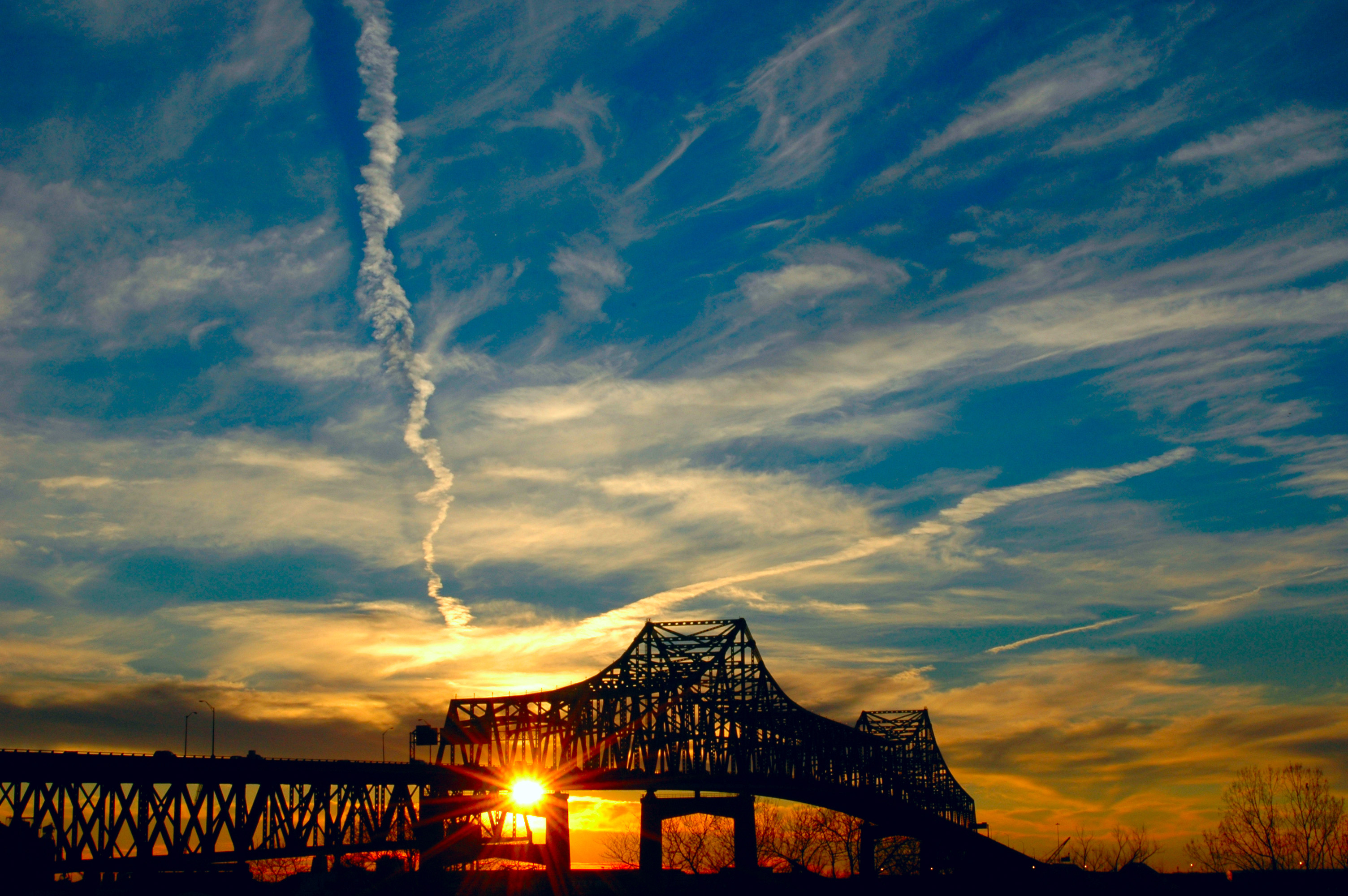
Horace Wilkinson Bridge

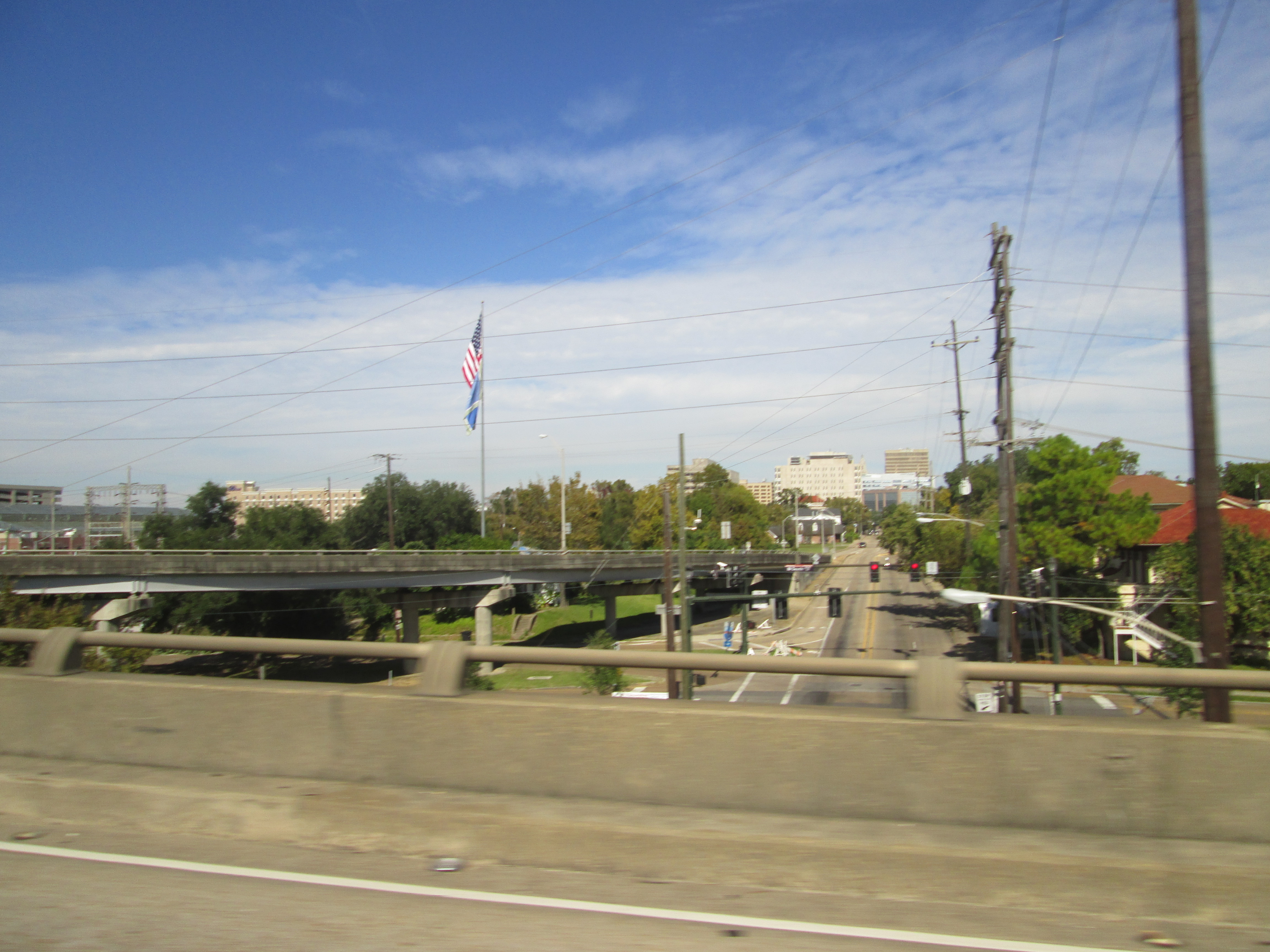
Interstate 10

Interstate 10 enters the city from the Horace Wilkinson Bridge over the Mississippi River, curving at an interchange with Interstate 110 southeast, crossing the LSU lakes and Garden District before reaching an interchange with I-12 (referred to as the 10/12 split). It curves further southeast toward New Orleans as it crosses Essen Lane near the Medical District. It passes Bluebonnet Blvd and the Mall of Louisiana at exit 162, and leaves Baton Rouge after interchanges with Siegen Lane and Highland Road.

Interstate 12 (The Republic of West Florida Parkway) begins in the city at the I-10/I-12 split east of College Drive, and proceeds eastward, crossing Essen Lane, Airline Hwy, Sherwood Forest Blvd, Millerville Road, and O'neal Lane before leaving the city when crossing the Amite River.

Interstate 110 (The Martin Luther King Jr. Expressway) stretches 8 miles in a north–south direction from the east end of the Horace Wilkinson Bridge to Scenic Highway in Scotlandville, Louisiana. It passes through downtown, North Baton Rouge, and Baton Rouge Metro Airport before ending at Scenic Highway.

==== U.S. highways and major roads ====
Baton Rouge has two U.S. highways, along with their business counterparts: Airline Highway (US 61) and Florida Boulevard.

U.S. 190 enters the city from the Huey P. Long Bridge, beginning a concurrency with U.S. 61 after an interchange with Scenic Highway, near Scotlandville. Its name is Airline Highway from this interchange to the interchange with Florida Blvd. At this interchange, U.S. 190 turns east to follow Florida Blvd through Northeast Baton Rouge, exiting the city at the Amite River.

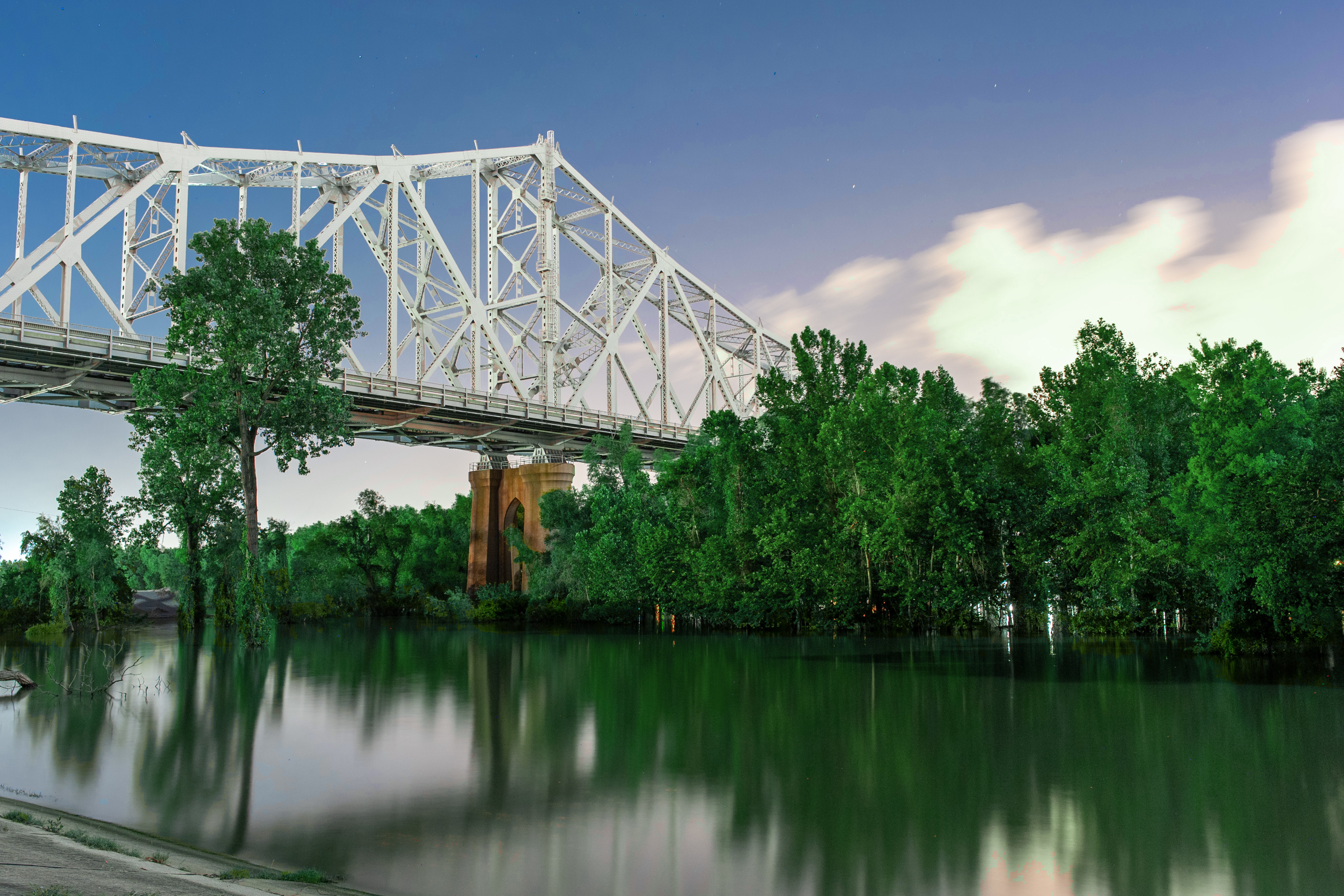
Huey P. Long Bridge

U.S. 61 enters Baton Rouge as Scenic Highway until it reaches Airline Highway (U.S. 190). It becomes concurrent with U.S. 190 until Florida Blvd, where it continues south, still called Airline Highway. It passes through Goodwood and Broadmoor before an interchange with I-12. It continues southeast past Bluebonnet Blvd/Coursey Blvd, Jefferson Hwy, and Sherwood Forest Blvd/Siegen Lane before exiting the city at Bayou Manchac.

U.S. 61/190 Business runs west along Florida Boulevard (known as Florida Street from Downtown east to Mid City) from Airline Highway to River Road in downtown. The cosigned routes run from Florida St. north along River Road, passing the Louisiana State Capitol and Capitol Park Complex before intersecting with Choctaw Drive. North of this intersection River Road becomes Chippewa Street and curves to the East. U.S. 61/190 Business leaves Chippewa Street at its intersection with Scenic Highway. The route follows Scenic Highway to Airline Highway, where it ends. North of Airline on Scenic and East of Scenic Highway on Airline is US 61. U.S. 190 is East and West of Scenic on Airline Highway.

These are important surface streets with designated state highway numbers: Greenwell Springs Road (LA 37), Plank Road/22nd Street (LA 67), Burbank Drive/Highland Road (LA 42), Nicholson Drive (LA 30), Jefferson Highway/Government Street (LA 73), Scotlandville/Baker/Zachary Highway (LA 19), Essen Lane (LA 3064), Bluebonnet Blvd/Coursey Blvd (LA 1248), Siegen Lane/Sherwood Forest Blvd (LA 3246), and Perkins Road/Acadian Thruway (LA 427).

==== Traffic issues and highway upgrades ====
According to the 2008 INRIX National Traffic Scorecard, which ranks the top 100 congested metropolitan areas in the U.S., Baton Rouge was the 33rd-most congested metro area in the country. At a population rank of 67 out of 100, it has the second-highest ratio of population rank to congestion rank, higher than even the Los Angeles-Long Beach-Santa Ana metropolitan area, indicating a remarkably high level of congestion for the comparatively low population. According to the Scorecard, Baton Rouge was the only area out of all 100 to show an increase in congestion from 2007 to 2008 (+ 6%). The city also tied for the highest jump in congestion rank over the same period (14 places).

Interstate 12 used to have a major bottleneck at O'Neal Lane. The interstate was three lanes wide in each direction to the O'Neal Lane exit, where the interstate abruptly became two lanes in each direction and crossed the narrow Amite River Bridge. This stretch of road, called "a deathtrap" by one lawmaker, had become notorious for traffic accidents, many with fatalities. In 2007, ten people died in traffic accidents within a three-month period on this section of road.

In 2009, Governor Bobby Jindal and the Baton Rouge legislative delegation allocated state and federal funding to widen I-12 from O'Neal Lane to Range Avenue (Exit 10) in Denham Springs. The construction was completed in 2012 and has significantly improved the flow of traffic. In 2010, The American Reinvestment and Recovery Act provided committed federal funds to widen I-12 from the Range Avenue Exit to Walker, Louisiana. Noticing the significant improvement in commute times, Jindal further funded widening to Satsuma, Louisiana.

Interstate 10 West at Bluebonnet Road also ranked within the top 1000 bottlenecks for 2008, and I-10 East at Essen Lane and Nicholson Drive ranked not far out of the top 1000. A new exit to the Mall of Louisiana was created in 2006, and the interstate was widened between Bluebonnet Blvd and Siegen Lane. But the stretch of I-10 from the I-10/I-12 split to Bluebonnet Blvd was not part of these improvements and remained heavily congested during peak hours. In response, a widening project totaling at least $87 million began in late 2008. Interstate 10 was widened to three lanes over a five-year period between the I-10/I-12 split and Highland Road. In 2010, the American Reinvestment and Recovery Act provided supplemental funding for this project to extend to the Highland Road exit in East Baton Rouge Parish.

Surface streets in Baton Rouge are prone to severe congestion. But roads are beginning to handle the number of vehicles using them after years of stagnation in road upgrades. Baton Rouge Mayor Kip Holden has instituted an extensive upgrade of East Baton Rouge Parish roads known as the Green Light Plan, geared toward improving areas of congestion on the city's surface streets. With its first project completed in 2008, it has seen numerous others reach completion as of 2015, with several more under construction and still others yet to break ground.

A circumferential loop freeway was proposed for the greater Baton Rouge metro area to help alleviate congestion on the existing through-town routes. The proposed loop would pass through the outlying parishes of Livingston (running alongside property owned and marketed as an industrial development by Al Coburn, a member of President Mike Grimmer's staff), Ascension, West Baton Rouge, and Iberville, as well as northern East Baton Rouge Parish. This proposal has been subject to much contention, particularly by residents living in the outer parishes through which the loop would pass.

=== Commuting ===
The average one-way commute time in Baton Rouge is 26.5 minutes, slightly less than the U.S. average of 27.1 minutes. Interstates 10, 110 and 12, which feed into the city, are highly traveled and connected by highways and four-lane roads that connect the downtown business area to surrounding parishes.

According to the 2016 American Community Survey, 81.9% of working Baton Rouge residents commuted by driving alone, 8.5% carpooled, 3% used public transportation, and 2.4% walked. About 1.2% used all other forms of transportation, including taxi, bicycle, and motorcycle. About 3.1% worked at home. In 2015, 10.4 percent of Baton Rouge households lacked a car, and increased slightly to 11.4 percent in 2016; higher than average for a city of its size. The national average was 8.7 percent in 2016. Baton Rouge averaged 1.55 cars per household in 2016, compared to a national average of 1.8.

=== Buses and other mass transit ===
Capital Area Transit System (CATS) provides urban transportation throughout Baton Rouge, including service to Southern University, Baton Rouge Community College, and Louisiana State University. Many CATS buses are equipped with bike racks for commuters to easily combine biking with bus transit.

Greyhound Bus Lines, which offers passenger and cargo service throughout the United States, has a downtown terminal on Florida Boulevard. Delta Bus Lines provides scheduled services to Memphis, Natchez, Greenville, Jackson, and other cities in the Mississippi Delta region.

=== Shipping ===
The Port of Baton Rouge is the ninth-largest in the United States by tonnage shipped, and is the farthest upstream Mississippi River port capable of handling Panamax ships.

=== Airport ===
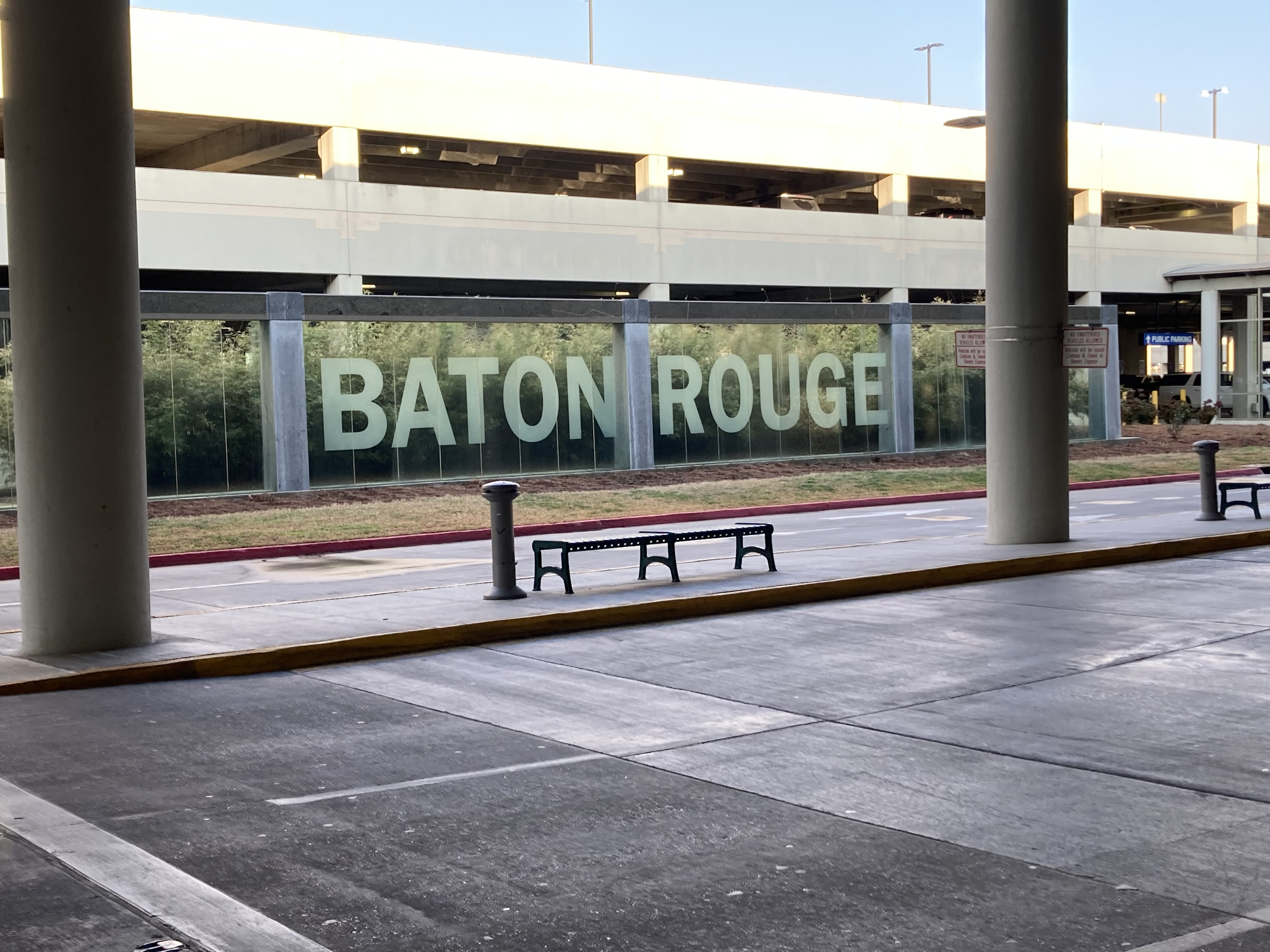
Baton Rouge Metropolitan Airport drop off lane

The Baton Rouge Metropolitan Airport, located in the North Baton Rouge community of Scotlandville, is situated just 10 minutes north of downtown and nearby Baker. The airport serves as a vital transportation hub, connecting the area with the four major airline hubs that serve the southern United States. Commercial carriers include American Eagle, United Airlines, and Delta Air Lines. Nonstop service is available to Washington, D.C.; Atlanta, Dallas/Fort Worth, Houston, and Charlotte.

=== Rail ===
Three major railroads, Canadian Pacific Kansas City, Union Pacific, and Canadian National provide railroad freight service to Baton Rouge.

The Yazoo and Mississippi Valley station had passenger service until the mid-1960s. The Kansas City Southern depot hosted the Southern Belle, the final train to serve the city, until 1969. Since 2006, Baton Rouge and New Orleans leaders as well as the state government have been pushing to secure funding for a new high-speed rail passenger line between downtown Baton Rouge and downtown New Orleans, with several stops in between. A new New Orleans–Baton Rouge passenger rail service was included as part of the "Amtrak Connects US" expansion vision.

== Sister cities ==
- Cairo, Cairo Governorate, Egypt (since 1951)
- Rouen, Seine-Maritime, France (since 1963)
- Taichung, Taiwan (since 1976)
- Ciudad Obregón, Sonora, Mexico (since 1977)
- Port-au-Prince, Ouest, Haiti (since 1978)
- Liège, Liège Province, Belgium (since 1985)
- Aix-en-Provence, Bouches-du-Rhône, France (since 1987)
- Córdoba, Veracruz, Mexico (since 2002)
- Heze, Shandong, China (since 2008)
- Malatya, Malatya Province, Turkey (since 2009)
- Guiyang, Guizhou, China (since 2010)

== See also ==
- Baton Rouge Police Department
- BREADA (Big River Economic and Agricultural Development Alliance)
- Cancer Alley
- East Baton Rouge Parish Sheriff's Office
- List of U.S. cities with large Black populations
- List of U.S. communities with African-American majority populations
