= McGehee School =

Louise S. McGehee School
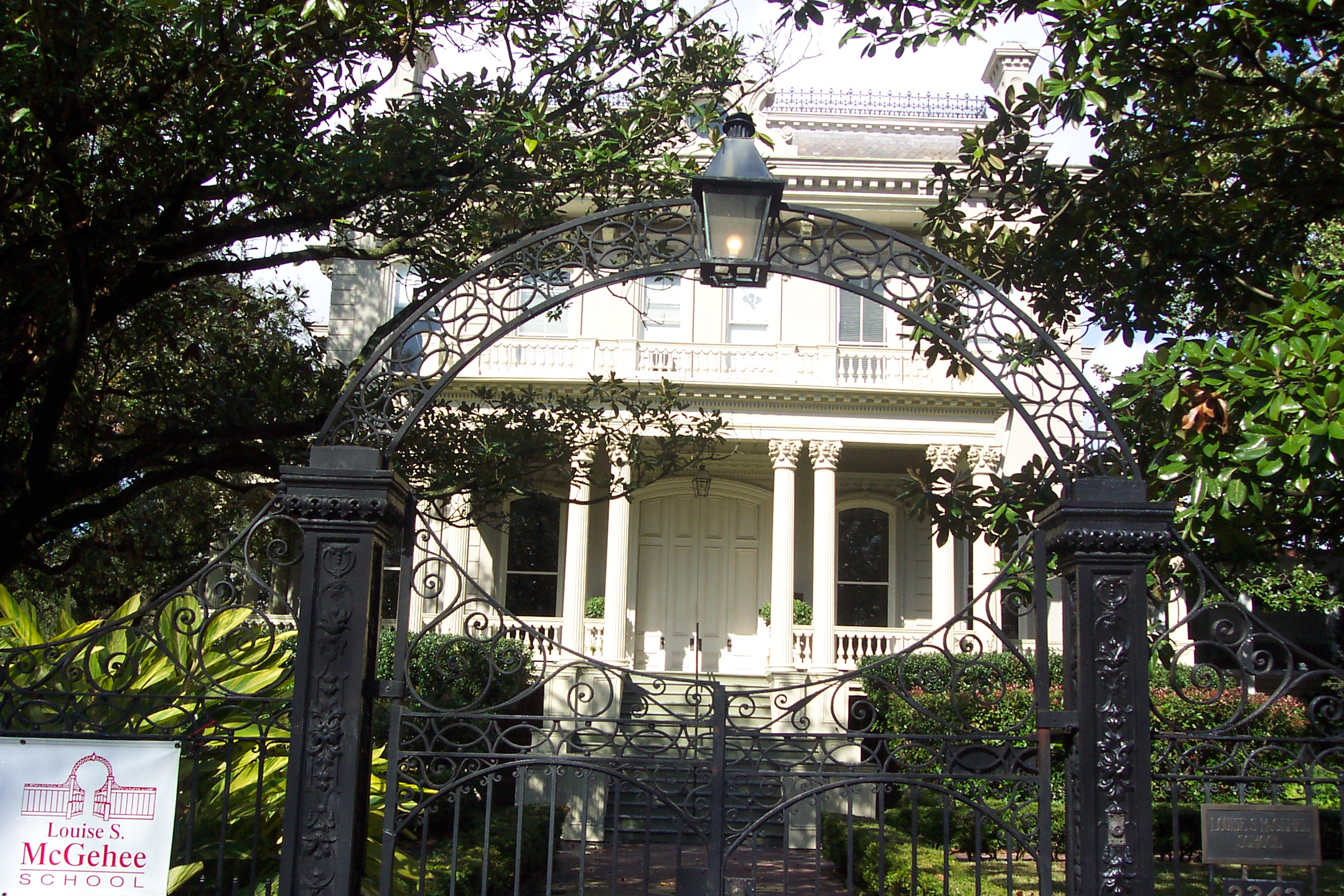
- The Louise S. McGehee School

Location
- 2343 Prytania Street; New Orleans, Louisiana 70130; USA; 29°55′55.33″N 90°4′54.46″W

Information
- Type: private, nondenominational, all-girls' college preparatory school
- Denomination: Non-denominational
- Established: 1912
- Founder: Louise S. McGehee
- Head of school: Hannah Dietsch (interim)
- Faculty: 102 (2015)
- Grades: PK – 12
- Gender: Girls
- Age range: 2-18
- Student to teacher ratio: 8:1
- Colours: Red and grey
- Song: "Hail Ms. McGehee"
- Athletics conference: Louisiana High School Athletic Association
- Sports: volleyball, soccer, golf, basketball, tennis, softball, swimming, track, cross country, gymnastics
- Mascot: Hawks
- Nickname: McGehee
- Team name: McGehee Hawks
- Accreditation: Independent Schools Association of the Southwest, National Association of Independent Schools, National Coalition of Girls' Schools
- Yearbook: Spectator
- Website: http://www.mcgeheeschool.com

The Louise S. McGehee School is an all-girls private, independent school in the Garden District in New Orleans, Louisiana, United States. The McGehee campus, which is one city block, has ten buildings and at least 100,000 square feet (9,300 m^{2}) of space.

== History ==
The school, founded by Louise S. McGehee, opened in September 1912 at 1439 Louisiana Avenue with 30 students. It was originally called Mrs. Chapman's School. It later moved into a mansion in the Garden District. In 1929, the school moved to the current location at 2343 Prytania Street. and became a corporation known as the Louise S. McGehee School. In the fall of 1929, there were 209 students and classes began with the fifth grade.

The 1938 Works Progress Administration New Orleans City Guide described it as one of the most popular private schools in New Orleans. In the 1950s, the school added grades Kindergarten through fourth grade. In 1962, a new Lower School building was dedicated for Kindergarten through Sixth Grade and in 1973, the first Pre-Kindergarten class started at the school.

According to Eli N. Evans' 1973 autobiography The Provincials, in its early history McGehee was where the New Orleans "elite" sent their children to "shield" them from minorities. Historically, many graduates of McGehee matriculated to H. Sophie Newcomb Memorial College of Tulane University. In 1973 Evans described the school as "[t]he debutante West Point, the playing fields of Eton, the New Orleans version of Choate-Chapin-Cordon Bleu all rolled into one". In the 1990s, McGehee started an Early Childhood Program, "Little Gate", which is a co-educational program for children aged one through four.

Before Hurricane Katrina, the school had about 500 students. After Katrina hit in August 2005, the school resumed classes in October, and by November 2005 the school was down to about half of its pre-Katrina enrollment. As of 2024, enrollment was approximately 450 students.

== Enrollment ==
McGehee School had 443 students enrolled as of the 2024–25 school year. The demographics were 77.9% white, 9.9% Black or African American, 8.4% two or more races, 2.3% Asian or Pacific Islander, and 1.6% Hispanic/Latina.

== Buildings ==
As of 2014, the campus had expanded to include six formerly residential mansions in the Garden District, including the Bradish Johnson House, designed by James Freret and Abby Hall, designed by Henry Howard.

== Facilities ==
The school, as of 2014, takes up almost all of the 2300 block of St. Charles Avenue. The original building, from 1872, is the Bradish Johnson House (2343 Pyritania Street). As of 2014 the school headquarters, library, and high school classrooms are in this building. Additionally, as of 2014, the school had acquired six residences in different years.

In 1996 it took control of 1528 Philip Street, and in the following year, it took control of what is now Paulette de la Vergne Stewart '57 Alumnae House (2336 St. Charles Avenue). As of 2014 the latter has the public relations department while the former has language and performing arts courses. In 2003 it took control of what is now Adelaide Wisdom Benjamin '50 Hall (2338 St. Charles Avenue). As of 2014 it has middle and high school classes. The Henry Howard-designed Abby Hall, which was constructed in the 1870s, opened as a school property in 2010. The building was named in the memory of a McGehee student. The last building, at 2318 St. Charles Avenue, which became the school's property in 2014, was to be made into a preschool facility.

== Athletics ==
McGehee School athletics competes in the LHSAA.

== Academics ==
McGehee's covers grades pre-kindergarten through twelfth grade. The school has a liberal arts education with STEM, humanities, and the arts. There are Advanced Placement (AP) courses.

== Notable alumni ==
- Charlotte Cooksey, retired American judge from Baltimore, Maryland.
- Madeline Haikala, United States district judge of the United States District Court for the Northern District of Alabama.
