= Isidore Newman School =

Private school in New Orleans, Louisiana, US

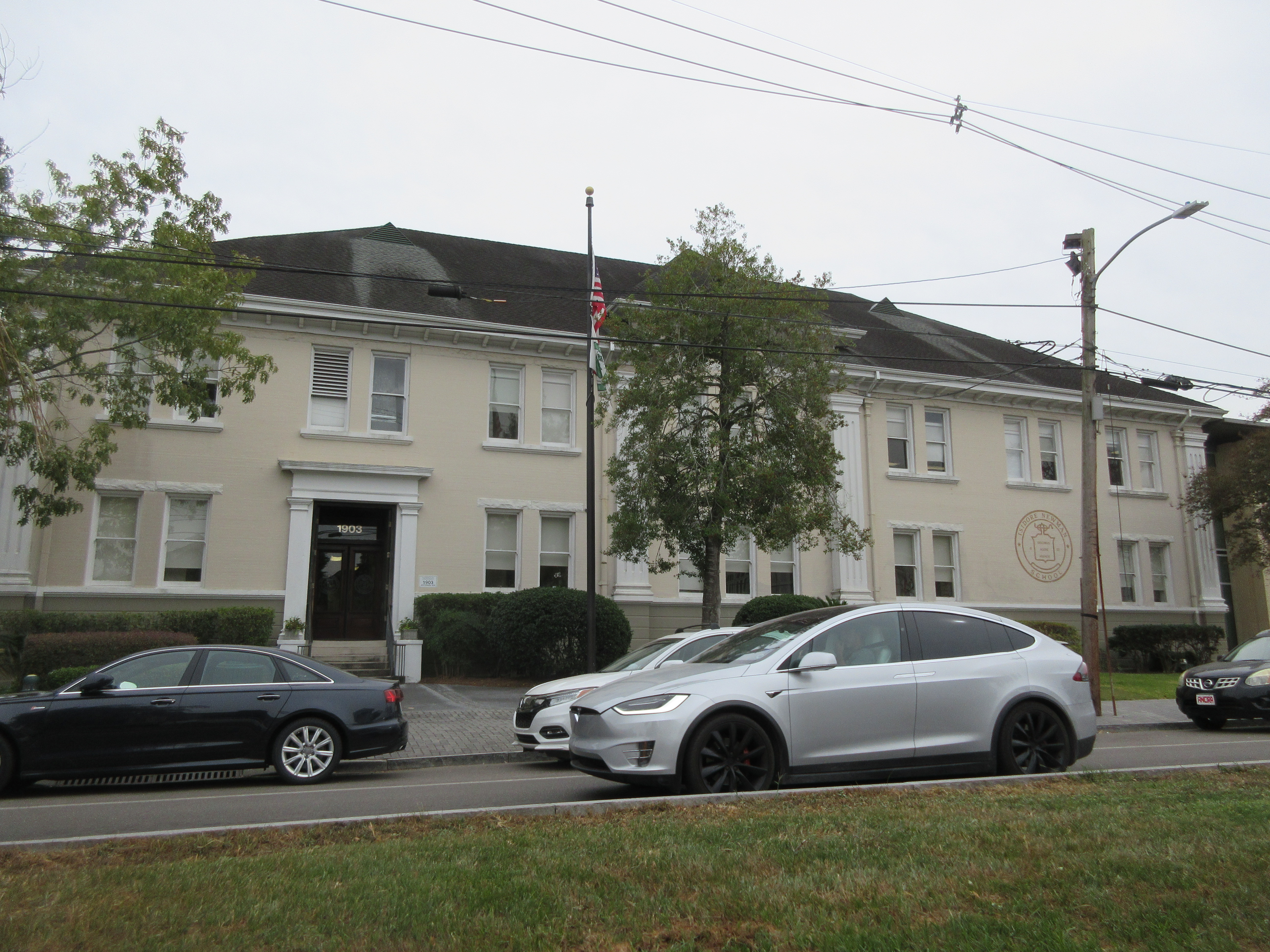
- Isidore Newman School in 2022

Location
- 1903 Jefferson Avenue; New Orleans, Louisiana 70115; United States; 29.9311°N 90.1116°W

Information
- Type: Private, college-prep, day
- Motto: Discimus Agere Agendo (We learn to do by doing)
- Denomination: Non-denominational
- Established: 1903
- Founder: Isidore Newman
- Head of school: Dale Smith
- Faculty: 208 (2021)
- Grades: PK – 12
- Gender: Coeducational
- Average class size: 15
- Student to teacher ratio: 6:1
- Campus size: 11 acres (4.5 ha)
- Colours: Kelly green, white
- Fight song: Green and White
- Athletics conference: LHSAA
- Mascot: Greenie Gator
- Nickname: Greenies
- Accreditation: NAIS – ISAS; SACS
- Newspaper: The Navigator
- Yearbook: Absinthe
- Endowment: ~$37,000,000 (2019-2020)
- Budget: ~$31,000,000 (2019-2020)
- Alumni: ~6,700
- Website: newmanschool.org
- The original school name, Isidore Newman Manual Training School, was changed to its current name in 1931.

Isidore Newman School is a private, nondenominational, coeducational college preparatory school located on an 11-acre (45,000 m^{2}) campus in the uptown section of New Orleans, Louisiana.

== History ==
Isidore Newman School was founded in 1903 by Isidore Newman, a New Orleans philanthropist and founder of the Maison Blanche department store chain. It opened its doors the following year as the Isidore Newman Manual Training School (the name was changed in 1931), and it was initially intended for Jewish orphans. Historically, Jewish charities supported the school. The school buildings suffered damage due to wind and flooding caused by 2005's Hurricane Katrina and was closed for two months. It reopened in January 2006, and by October 2006 enrollment fully recovered. As of April 2022, the school is the target of a sealed federal civil rights lawsuit, filed in 2018, related to Title IX violations in connection with a separate lawsuit against a student convicted of sexual battery.

Newman offers comprehensive education for students in grades pre-kindergarten through 12th grade, organized into Lower, Middle and Upper schools. Eli N. Evans wrote in the 1973 book The Provincials: A Personal History of Jews in the South that Newman is "highly oriented to college admission." The school is a member of the Independent Schools Association of the Southwest and the National Association of Independent Schools. The school also offers four foreign languages, including Honors and/or AP classes in each language: French, Spanish, Latin and Chinese. In order to be on the honor roll, students must maintain a 3.67 GPA. This includes a one GPA point addition for both honors and AP courses.

Jeré Longman of The New York Times described Isidore Newman as "one of Louisiana's elite private schools."

=== Enrollment ===
Newman has a student body of 1,055 and a faculty of 208, with an average class size of 15 students per class. Newman has 434 students in its lower school, 253 in its middle school, and 368 in its upper school. About 40% of the students were Jewish circa 1973, and historically in the 20th century there was social distance between Jewish and non-Jewish students that began with private dances held by non-Jewish students.

== Athletics ==
Newman's athletic teams compete in the Louisiana High School Athletic Association. The school fields teams on a number of sports, including baseball, basketball, cross country, football, golf, gymnastics, lacrosse, soccer, swimming, tennis, track and volleyball. Newman has held 113 State Championships as of December 2023. The largest building on campus is the Cotonio Palaestra.

Pro Football Hall of Fame quarterback Peyton Manning attended the high school, leading their football team to a 34–5 record during his three seasons as its starter. He was named Gatorade Circle of Champions National Player-of-the-Year and Columbus (Ohio) Touchdown Club National Offensive Player-of-the-Year in 1993. While at Newman, he began wearing the #18 jersey in honor of his older brother Cooper, who was forced to give up football due to spinal stenosis. Younger brother Eli also wore the number when he became starting quarterback. Newman has since retired the #18 jersey and it can be seen hanging in the school gym. Peyton was among the most sought after high school players in the country and was recruited by 60 colleges. Cooper's son Arch, the most recent Newman quarterback, was touted as one of the top players in the college recruiting class of 2023 before committing to Texas.

Jeremy Bleich, later selected in the first round of the 2008 Major League Baseball draft by the New York Yankees, played baseball for the school, graduating in 2005. In high school by his junior year he had what author Michael Lewis described as "a decent fastball, great command, a big-league change-up and charm to burn," and had over 40 colleges recruiting him. Bleich was named a 2005 first-team All-American by Collegiate Baseball (Louisville Slugger), a third-team All American by Baseball America, and the 2005 All-Metro Player of the Year. He was named All-State in Louisiana twice, was the 2004 and 2005 District Most Valuable Player, and in 2003-2005 was named a three-time All-District, All-Metro, and All-Orleans teams player.

In May 2010, ESPN.com ranked Newman at the top of a survey of which high schools produce the best NFL players — even though the school had at the time only produced three NFL players: Omar Douglas and the Manning brothers. NFL wide receiver Odell Beckham Jr. graduated from Newman in 2011.

== Notable alumni ==
- Marion Abramson – civic leader, founder of WYES-TV
- Bryan Batt – Broadway stage, film and television actor; star of AMC series Mad Men.
- Odell Beckham Jr. – NFL wide receiver
- Jeremy Bleich – American-Israeli baseball player.
- Edward D. Dart – Modernist architect
- Stuart Delery - White House Counsel for Joe Biden administration
- Omar Douglas – former NFL wide receiver for the New York Giants.
- Christine D'Souza Gelb – film executive
- Donald Ensenat – former United States chief of protocol and US ambassador to Brunei.
- Kelvin Harrison Jr. – film actor
- Walter Isaacson – historian, former editor of Time magazine, former chairman and CEO of Cable News Network, and current president of the Aspen Institute.
- Leslie Jacobs – education reform advocate, business executive and philanthropist.
- Corey Johnson – actor
- Michael Lewis – author
- Randy Livingston – professional basketball player
- John C. Lovell – Olympic sailor, 2004 Summer Olympics.
- Arch Manning – grandson of Archie Manning, son of Cooper Manning. Quarterback for the Texas Longhorns.
- Cooper Manning – former football player, oil and stock trader. Eldest son of NFL quarterback Archie Manning.
- Eli Manning – former NFL quarterback for the New York Giants and MVP of Super Bowls XLII and XLVI. Youngest son of NFL quarterback Archie Manning.
- Peyton Manning – Hall of Fame NFL quarterback for the Indianapolis Colts and Denver Broncos, and MVP of Super Bowl XLI. Middle son of former NFL quarterback Archie Manning.
- Bessie Margolin – US Department of Labor attorney from 1939 until 1972, arguing cases before Supreme Court.
- Chris Mooney – journalist and author of the New York Times Best Seller The Republican War on Science.
- Brad A. Myers – Professor of Human Computer Interaction at Carnegie Mellon University.
- Herman Neugass – field and track athlete
- Mark Plotkin – ethnobotanist and advocate for tropical rainforest conservation.
- Christopher Rice – best-selling author of A Density of Souls, The Snow Garden, and Light Before Day; son of author Anne Rice.
- Rilan – pop singer, actor, starred in final season of TV Series Glee.
- Monk Simons – elected to the College Football Hall of Fame in 1963 after playing for Tulane University.
- Bruce Spizer – author of books about The Beatles.
- Sean Tuohy – former professional basketball player, broadcaster for the Memphis Grizzlies of the National Basketball Association; central figure of The Blind Side about football player Michael Oher.
- Mo Willems – animator, children's book author.
- Mary Louise Wilson – Tony and Drama Desk Award-winning American stage, film and television actress.
- John Minor Wisdom – judge of the United States Court of Appeals for the Fifth Circuit.
