= 2001 Fayetteville, North Carolina mayoral election =

2001 Fayetteville mayoral election

Fayetteville, North Carolina mayoral election, 2001
- November 6, 2001
Candidate	Marshall Pitts Jr.	Milo McBryde
Popular vote	11,548	9,061
Percentage	55.85%	43.82%
Mayor before election
Milo McBryde
Elected mayor
Marshall Pitts Jr.
Democratic

The 2001 Fayetteville mayoral election took place on November 6, 2001, to elect the mayor of Fayetteville, North Carolina. It saw the election of mayor Marshall Pitts Jr., who unseated incumbent mayor Milo McBryde, who had taken office following the death of J.L. Dawkins.

Pitts became the city's first African American mayor.

== Results ==
=== Primary ===
The primary was held October 9, 2001.

Primary results
Party	Candidate	Votes	%
Nonpartisan	Marshall Pitts Jr.	5,426	40.82
Nonpartisan	Milo McBryde (incumbent)	3,948	29.70
Nonpartisan	Johnny Dawkins	3,580	26.93
Nonpartisan	Ronnie Lee Peele	149	1.12
Nonpartisan	Edna M. Pickett	104	0.78
Nonpartisan	Shawn E. Townsend	62	0.47
Nonpartisan	Leonard Hicks	24	0.18

=== General election ===
General election results
Party	Candidate	Votes	%
Nonpartisan	Marshall Pitts Jr.	11,548	55.85
Nonpartisan	Milo McBryde (incumbent)	9,061	43.82
Write-in	Write-in	68	0.33
