= Edwin Robeson MacKethan =

American politician (1869–1951)

Member of the North Carolina House of Representatives from Cumberland County
- In office 1901–1901

Mayor of Fayetteville
- In office 1921–1923

Member of the North Carolina Senate from the 10th district
- In office 1925–1929 Serving with Oscar Lee Clark and James Albert Bridger
- Preceded by: Joseph W. Ruark; Joseph Addison Brown
- Succeeded by: Thomas Heber Lindsey; Walter Hogue Powell

Personal details
- Born: September 7, 1869 Cool Spring Place, Fayetteville, North Carolina, U.S.
- Died: December 16, 1951 (aged 82) Richmond County, Georgia, U.S.
- Party: Democratic
- Spouse: Lulie Williams Biggs (m. 1906)

Edwin Robeson MacKethan (September 7, 1869 - December 16, 1951) was an American lawyer, a white supremacist, and a Democratic party politician in North Carolina, where he was a member of both chambers of the General Assembly. After serving in the Spanish–American War, he was elected to the North Carolina House of Representatives, elected mayor of Fayetteville, and elected to the North Carolina Senate.

== Biography ==
MacKethan was born September 7, 1869, to Edwin Turner MacKethan and Janie Wright MacKethan (née Robeson) in the family home Cool Spring Place in Fayetteville, North Carolina. The house belonged to his family for generations after his grandfather Alfred A. MacKethan purchased it in 1860.

Edwin was the eldest of five children with three brothers and one sister. He attended Davidson College, graduated from the University of North Carolina in 1891 and received his law degree in 1892 from the law school at the same university. After living in Savannah, Georgia, for a few years, he returned to Fayetteville and worked as a lawyer.

He served in the Spanish–American War and he continued after the war as an officer in the Fayetteville Independent Light Infantry. He was the rank of captain until he retired around 1911 and was given the rank of major.

MacKethan married Lulie Williams Biggs in 1906, the granddaughter of Asa Biggs, they married in her home town Oxford, North Carolina. He had three children, including a son Edwin Robeson MacKethan Jr. and grandson Edwin Robeson MacKethan III.

He was a white supremacist, and in March 1900 he was elected as the president of the White Supremacy Club in Fayetteville. He retired from the post by the end of the year as he was running for a seat in the House of Representatives.

MacKethan was elected to represent Cumberland County in the North Carolina House of Representatives as a member of the Democratic party in 1901. Due to his military service he was selected as the chairman of the House Committee on Military Affairs. He later served as mayor of Fayetteville 1921–1923 and then he served in the North Carolina Senate from 1925–1929.

He was one of the incorporators of the Cumberland County Genealogical and Historical Society. He was a state commander of the Sons of Confederate Veterans and a member of the Sons of the Revolution.

MacKethan died on December 16, 1951, at the age of 82, after suffering a long illness.
