= Marshall Pitts Jr. =

American lawyer

Mayor of Fayetteville, North Carolina
- In office December 3, 2001 – December 2005
- Preceded by: Milo McBryde
- Succeeded by: Tony Chavonne

Personal details
- Profession: Democratic

Marshall B. Pitts Jr. is an American lawyer and politician. He served as the Mayor of Fayetteville, North Carolina, for two terms from 2001 until 2005. Pitts was the city's first African-American mayor.

== Biography ==
Pitts attended Westover High School in Fayetteville, where he was a member of school's track team. He graduated from the North Carolina Central University School of Law in 1990.

=== Political career ===
Pitts first ran for a seat on the Fayetteville City Council in 1997, but lost the election by only 66 votes. However, he staged a comeback and won election to a city council at-large seat in 1999, becoming the first African-American elected to city council in twenty years.

In 2001, Pitts ran for Mayor of Fayetteville against incumbent Mayor Milo McBryde. McBryde, a third generation member of a prominent Fayetteville political family, had served on the city council for twenty-two years on the city council at the time. McBryde had been appointed as Mayor of Fayetteville in August 2000 following the death of longtime Mayor J.L. Dawkins, who died in office. Pitts' 2001 campaign slogan was "Change Is Coming."

Pitts defeated McBryde in the mayoral election held on November 6, 2001. He earned approximately 56% of the vote (11,405 votes), while incumbent Mayor McBryde placed second with 44% (8,979 votes). Pitts was sworn into office on December 3, 2001, becoming the city's first African-American mayor. He was re-elected to a second term in a mayoral runoff election held on November 4, 2003. Pitts easily defeated his opponent, real estate agent Robert Anderson, in the 2003 runoff. Pitts' 2003 slogan was "Change Is Now."

Under Pitts' second term, areas of adjacent Cumberland County, North Carolina, were annexed into Fayetteville, adding approximately 43,000 new residents to the city's population.

Pitts was defeated for re-election on November 8, 2005, by Tony Chavonne. Chavonne received around 55% of the vote in 2005. The annexations of new areas into Fayetteville seemed to play a pivotal role in the election. Chavonne overwhelmingly defeated Pitts in the newly annexed areas of the city.
