= 2011 Fayetteville, North Carolina mayoral election =

Fayetteville, North Carolina mayoral election, 2011
- November 8, 2011

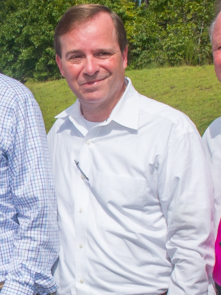
Candidate	Tony Chavonne	Nat Robertson
Popular vote	11,591	11,331
Percentage	50.49%	49.36%
Mayor before election
Tony Chavonne
Elected mayor
Tony Chavonne

The 2011 Fayetteville mayoral election took place on November 8, 2011, to elect the mayor of Fayetteville, North Carolina. It saw the reelection of incumbent mayor Tony Chavonne.

== Results ==
=== Primary ===
The primary was held October 8, 2011.

Primary results
Party	Candidate	Votes	%
Nonpartisan	Tony Chavonne (incumbent)	3,612	53.73
Nonpartisan	Nat Robertson	1,692	25.17
Nonpartisan	Bob White	1,091	16.23
Nonpartisan	Charles Ragan	328	4.88

=== General election ===
General election results
Party	Candidate	Votes	%
Nonpartisan	Tony Chavonne (incumbent)	6,673	56.62
Nonpartisan	Nat Robertson	5,055	42.89
Write-in	Write-in	58	0.49
