= BBQGuys =

Barbecue grill retailer

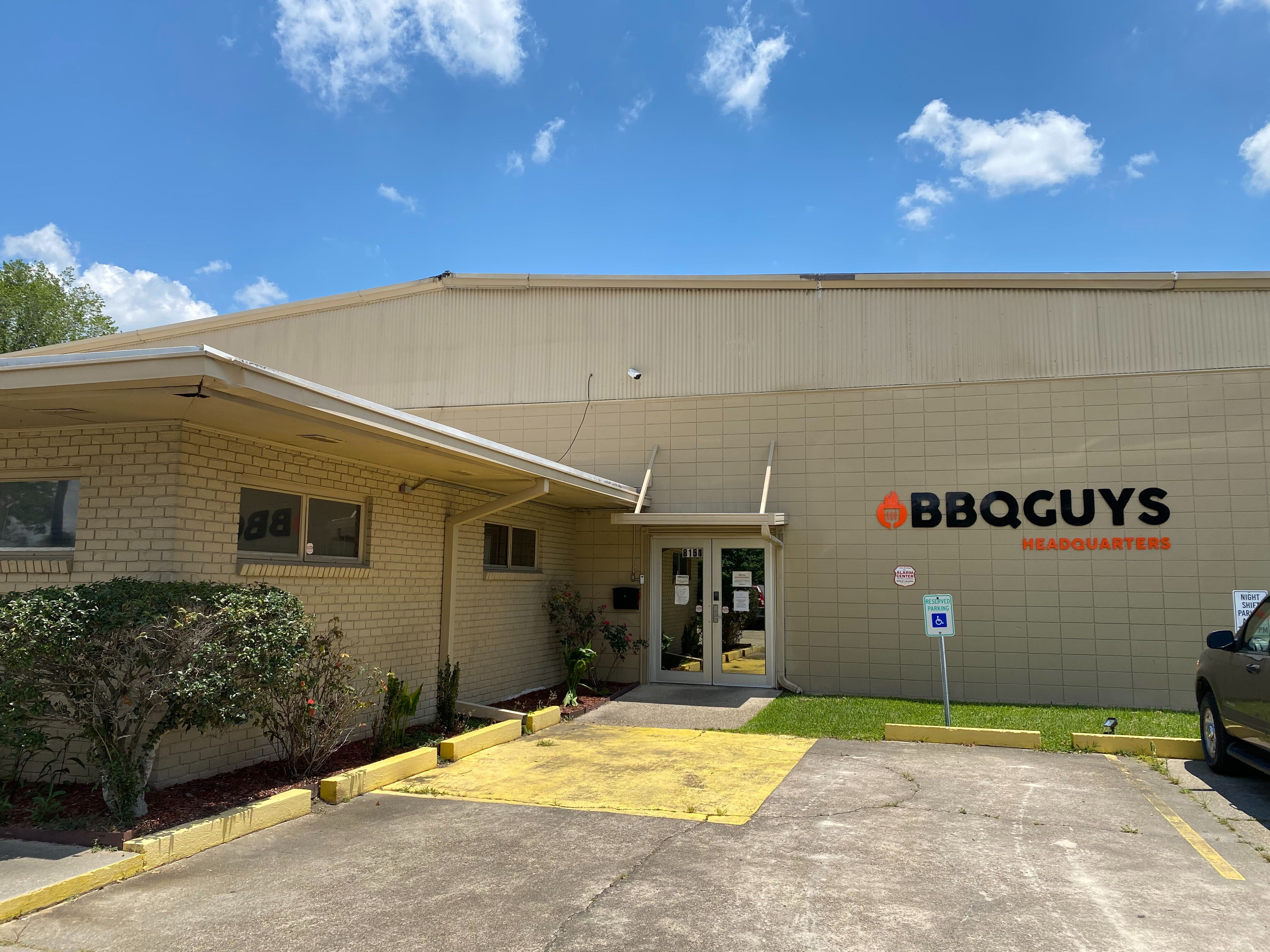
- Company type: Private
- Industry: Retail
- Predecessor: ShoppersChoice.com
- Founded: 1998
- Founder: Mike Hackley and Ladina Hackley
- Headquarters: Baton Rouge, United States
- Owner: Brand Velocity Partners
- Number of employees: 294 (2021)
- Website: bbqguys.com

BBQGuys is a barbecue grill retailer headquartered in Baton Rouge, Louisiana. It was founded in 1998 by Air Force veteran Michael Hackley and his wife, Ladina Hackley, as the Grill Store & More, and later rebranded as BBQGuys as the store transitioned to online retail during the dot-com bubble. In 2019, BBQGuys was awarded the Small Business of the Week by the United States Senate Committee. In late 2020, the company was acquired by private equity firm Brand Velocity Partners.

== History ==
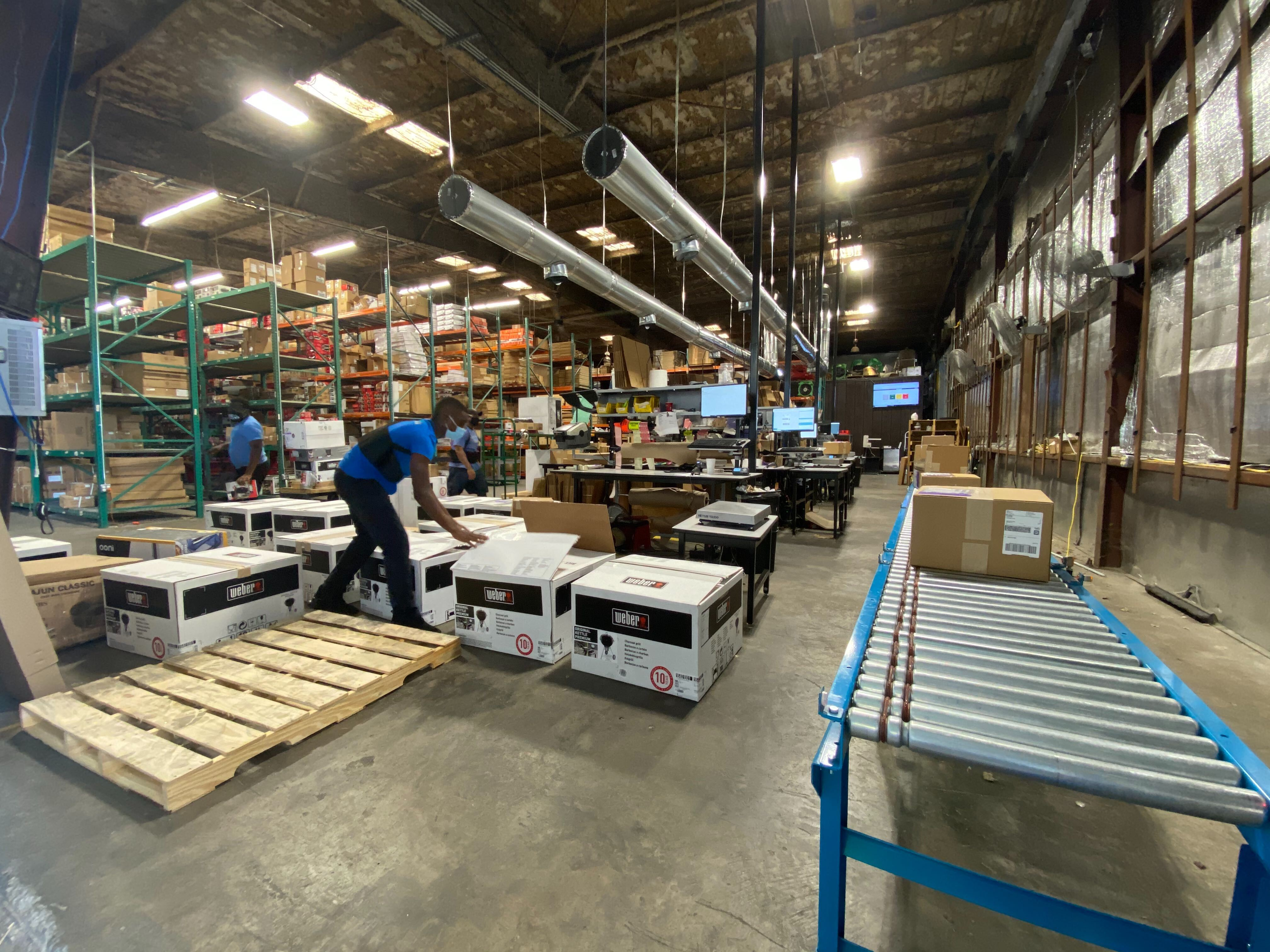
BBQGuys' expanded warehouse.

In 1998, husband and wife Michael and Ladina Hackley founded the Grill Store & More in Baton Rouge, on Tiger Bend Road. The couple were inspired to start their own barbecue grill retailer after passing by a Barbecues Galore store in Des Moines, Iowa, and started their business without financial or investor capital. When Grill Store & More suffered financial difficulties during the dot-com bubble, Michael Hackley teamed up with Corey Tisdale to launch the e-commerce bbqguys.com website. Online success resulted in the closure of the company's three brick and mortar stores within a year.

Selling from their homes in 2003, Shopperschoice.com was launched in 2004. Between 2003 and 2016, Shopperschoice.com grew from five to 140 employees. Mike Hackley and Corey Tisdale founded Blaze Outdoor Products to manufacture grills, smokers, and drawers. The company was named Small Business of the Week by the United States Senate Committee in 2019, by which time it was on the Inc. 5000 list for 11 consecutive years. The same year, Shopperschoice.com consolidated its brand under BBQGuys.com, the original name of the company.

BBQGuys expanded its headquarters in September 2019 to accommodate 50 new customer support positions in the company. According to Louisiana Economic Development, the expansion also created 22 jobs indirectly. During the 2020 COVID-19 pandemic, BBQGuys was able to continue hiring, while transitioning about 90 percent of their team to remote work. Warehouse workers unable to work from home were protected by new safety guidelines, facility procedures, and sanitation infrastructure.

=== Acquisitions ===
Original owner Michael Hackley sold BBQGuys to Brand Velocity Partners (BVP) in August 2020, a private equity firm. BVP also purchased BBQGuys' sister company, Blaze Outdoor.

As part of the acquisition, BVP brought on several NFL greats as strategic investors including: Archie Manning and sons Cooper Manning, Peyton Manning and Eli Manning along with LaDainian Tomlinson and Steve Hutchinson.

In March 2021, BBQGuys announced that Eli Manning and his father Archie Manning would be starring in national advertising campaign to promote the brand.

In 2025, BBQGuys acquired modular outdoor kitchen island and grill manufacturing company, Mont Alpi.
