= 2003 Fayetteville, North Carolina mayoral election =

Fayetteville, North Carolina mayoral election, 2003
- November 4, 2003
Candidate	Marshall Pitts Jr.	Robert C. Anderson
Popular vote	11,072	5,732
Percentage	65.50%	33.91%
Mayor before election
Marshall Pitts Jr.
Democratic
Elected mayor
Marshall Pitts Jr.
Democratic

The 2003 Fayetteville mayoral election took place on November 4, 2003, to elect the mayor of Fayetteville, North Carolina. It saw the reelection of incumbent mayor Marshall Pitts Jr.

== Results ==
Results
Party	Candidate	Votes	%
Nonpartisan	Marshall Pitts Jr. (incumbent)	11,072	65.50
Nonpartisan	Robert C. Anderson	5,732	33.91
Write-in	Write-in	100	0.59
