= Ben Weprin =

American businessman

Ben Weprin (born June 28, 1978) is the founder and CEO of AJ Capital Partners, a private real estate investment company based in Nashville, TN. Weprin and AJ Capital founded Graduate Hotels in 2014, later selling it to Hilton Worldwide in 2024.

== Early life and education ==
Weprin was born and raised in Oakwood, OH, a Dayton, OH suburb. He graduated from the University of Tennessee. Weprin completed his MBA at Kellogg School of Management.

== Career ==
In 2008, Weprin founded AJ Capital Partners. In Chicago, he restored the Hotel Lincoln, Chicago Athletic Association, Soho House, and Thompson Chicago. The current portfolio includes projects throughout Nashville, TN as well as Chicago Athletic Association in Chicago, The Pontchartrain Hotel in New Orleans, Memoir Residential in Portland, OR, New Orleans, and Nashville, TN, among others. He founded Graduate Hotels in 2014, Marine & Lawn Hotels & Resorts in 2021, and Memoir Residential in 2023. In 2023, AJ Capital announced a partnership with Starwood Capital Group to create Field & Stream Lodge Co., a branded hospitality platform backed by the legacy and expertise of the Field & Stream brand. Field & Stream Lodge Co. rolled out its first property in Bozeman, MT in 2025. In 2024, AJ Capital announced the acquisition and restoration of Coral Sands Inn & Cottages, an iconic property on Harbour Island in the Bahamas. Additional active projects include The Armory in San Francisco; Wedgewood Village in Nashville, TN; Belle Meade Village in Nashville, TN; Little River in Miami; as well as Rusacks St Andrews overlooking the Old Course in St Andrews, Scotland, which opened in July 2021 and is part of Marine & Lawn Hotels & Resorts.

== Awards ==
- Condé Nast Traveller Gold List 2026 – Coral Sands Inn & Cottages
- Worth Magazine Worthy100 List 2025 – Ben Weprin
- Fast Company Most Innovative Companies of 2025 – AJ Capital Partners
- The International Society of Hospitality Consultants 2025 Pioneer Award – Ben Weprin
- Travel + Leisure 100 Best New Hotels 2024 – Slieve Donard – Marine & Lawn Hotels & Resorts
- Commercial Observer Power 100 2023 – Ben Weprin
- Travel + Leisure 100 Best New Hotels 2022 – Rusacks St Andrews – Marine & Lawn Hotels & Resorts
- Fast Company Most Innovative Companies of 2018 – Graduate Hotels
- Inc. Magazine 2017 Design Awards, Best Interior Design – Graduate Hotels
- Fast Company Most Innovative Companies of 2016 – AJ Capital Partners
- Urban Land Institute Chicago’s Catalytic Redevelopment 2016 – Chicago Athletic Association
- James Beard Foundation Outstanding Restaurant Design Finalist 2016 – Cherry Circle Room – Chicago Athletic Association
- James Beard Foundation Outstanding Restaurant Design Finalist 2016 – Cindy’s – Chicago Athletic Association
- National Trust for Historic Preservation Driehaus Preservation Award 2015 – Chicago Athletic Association
