= Monroe Evans =

American politician

Mayor of Fayetteville, North Carolina
- In office 1965–1969
- Preceded by: Wilber Clark
- Succeeded by: Charles B.C. Holt

Personal details
- Spouse: Mildred (nee Dlugin) Evans
- Profession: Democratic

Monroe E. Evans is an American politician who served as the mayor of Fayetteville, North Carolina, from 1965 until 1969. He was the city's first Jewish mayor. Evans helped to lead Fayetteville's desegregation reforms during the 1960s.

The Evans family are the descendants of Lithuanian Jews who immigrated to the United States. Monroe Evans's father, Isaac Evans, was born in a shtetl in present-day Lithuania in 1877. Evans's brother, Mutt Evans, served as the mayor of Durham, North Carolina, from 1951 to 1963. His nephew, Eli Evans, is the author of The Provincials: A Personal History of Jews in the South.

As mayor, Evans helped to lead Fayetteville's desegregation during the Civil Rights Movement. He worked with various city community and civic leaders to work on the transition. In 2001, Monroe told the Fayetteville Observer, "It was a rough time... But I got a lot of good people to work with. It worked here in Fayetteville." On February 1, 2001, Fayetteville State University (FSU) honored former Mayor Evans and three others for their efforts during the Civil Rights Movement.

Evans later served as an appointed member of the Fayetteville Airport Commission circa 1990 with former mayor Beth Finch.
