= Weprin =

Weprin is a surname. Notable people with the surname include:

- Ben Weprin (born 1978), American businessman
- David Weprin (born 1956), American lawyer and politician
- Mark Weprin (born 1961), American politician, son of Saul
- Saul Weprin (1927–1994), American attorney and politician
