= AirGarage =

American parking management company

- Type: Private
- Industry: Parking management
- Founded: 2017; 9 years ago
- Founders: Scott Fitsimones; Jonathon Barkl; Chelsea Border
- Headquarters: San Francisco, California, U.S.
- Number of locations: 300+ parking facilities (2025)
- Website: www.airgarage.com

AirGarage is an American parking management company that partners with real estate owners to operate their parking lots and garages. The company has developed a license plate recognition camera system to automatically detect when vehicles enter and exit.

== History and growth ==
AirGarage was founded by Scott Fitsimones, Jonathon Barkl, and Chelsea Border in 2017. The trio met and conceived the idea for AirGarage while attending Arizona State University, initially renting out driveway spaces near campus to college students. The company offers parking operations, enforcement, and mobile payments to over 300 parking facilities. After partnering with several nearby churches and Graduate Hotels locations to manage their parking operations, the company began managing surface lots and garages.

AirGarage has raised $40m from Andreessen Horowitz, Founders Fund, and Headline and has also received investment from angel investors.

The company manages parking operations for major real estate firms including Hines and Greystar, as well as office campuses like Meta.

AirGarage was on Forbes 30 Under 30 - Consumer Technology (2023).
