= 2007 Fayetteville, North Carolina, mayoral election =

Fayetteville, North Carolina mayoral election, 2007
- November 6, 2007
Candidate	Tony Chavonne
Popular vote	11,385
Percentage	93.87%
Mayor before election
Tony Chavonne
Elected mayor
Tony Chavonne

The 2007 Fayetteville mayoral election took place on November 6, 2007, to elect the mayor of Fayetteville, North Carolina. It saw the reelection of incumbent mayor Tony Chavonne.

== Results ==
Results
Party	Candidate	Votes	%
Nonpartisan	Tony Chavonne (incumbent)	11,385	93.87
Write-in	Write-in	744	6.13
