= 2009 Fayetteville, North Carolina mayoral election =

Fayetteville, North Carolina mayoral election, 2009
- November 8, 2009
Candidate	Tony Chavonne	Bob White
Popular vote	7,030	3,466
Percentage	66.53%	32.80%
Mayor before election
Tony Chavonne
Elected mayor
Tony Chavonne

The 2009 Fayetteville mayoral election took place on November 8, 2009, to elect the mayor of Fayetteville, North Carolina. It saw the reelection of incumbent mayor Tony Chavonne.

== Results ==
=== Primary ===
The primary was held October 6, 2009.

Primary results
Party	Candidate	Votes	%
Nonpartisan	Tony Chavonne (incumbent)	4.317	66.23
Nonpartisan	Bob White	987	15.14
Nonpartisan	Ronnie L. Peele	626	9.60
Nonpartisan	Charles B. Ragan	320	4.91
Nonpartisan	Economy "Mohammed" Smith	268	4.11

=== General election ===
General election results
Party	Candidate	Votes	%
Nonpartisan	Tony Chavonne (incumbent)	7,030	66.53
Nonpartisan	Bob White	3,466	32.80
Write-in	Write-in	71	0.67
