= 2005 Fayetteville, North Carolina mayoral election =

Fayetteville, North Carolina mayoral election, 2005
- November 8, 2005
| Candidate | Tony Chavonne | Marshall Pitts Jr. |
| Popular vote | 16,939 | 12,741 |
| Percentage | 56.96% | 42.84% |
Mayor before election
Marshall Pitts Jr.
Democratic
Elected mayor
Tony Chavonne

The 2005 Fayetteville mayoral election took place on November 8, 2005, to elect the mayor of Fayetteville, North Carolina. It saw the election Tony Chavonne, who unseated incumbent mayor Marshall Pitts Jr.

== Results ==
General election results
| Party | Candidate | Votes | % |
|---|---|---|---|
| Nonpartisan | Tony Chavonne | 16,939 | 56.96 |
| Nonpartisan | Marshall Pitts Jr. (incumbent) | 12,741 | 42.84 |
| Write-in | Write-in | 58 | 0.20 |
