= J.L. Dawkins =

American politician

Mayor of Fayetteville, North Carolina
- In office 1987 – May 30, 2000
- Preceded by: Bill Hurley
- Succeeded by: Milo McBryde

Personal details
- Born: November 25, 1935 Cumberland County, North Carolina
- Died: May 30, 2000 (aged 64) Fayetteville, North Carolina

J.L. Dawkins (November 25, 1935 – May 30, 2000) was an American politician. Dawkins' served as the Mayor of Fayetteville, North Carolina, from 1987 until 2000, the longest tenure of any mayor in the city's history. He died in office on May 30, 2000.

Dawkins also served on the Fayetteville City Council for the twelve years prior to his election as mayor in 1987.

== Biography ==
=== Early life ===
Dawkins was born on November 25, 1935, in Cumberland County, North Carolina. His father, Johnny L. Dawkins, was a member of the North Carolina General Assembly. J.L. Dawkins reportedly proclaimed that he would be Mayor of Fayetteville when he was just 12 years old.

=== Political career ===
Dawkins' career in Fayetteville city government spanned more than twenty-five years. He served on the Fayetteville City Council for twelve years, from 1975 to 1987. Dawkins was first elected Mayor of Fayetteville in 1987, succeeding outgoing Mayor Bill Hurley. Dawkins would ultimately win re-election for seven terms. (Mayors of Fayetteville are elected for two-year terms in office).

Dawkins was a proponent of the city's downtown revitalization. He sought to change downtown's former reputation for high crime and urban decay throughout his tenure as mayor. Dawkins was known for working more than 60 hours per week while in office.

The Fayetteville City Council honored Dawkins in 1998 with a plaque installed in a newly renovated area of downtown, which the council renamed Dawkins Plaza. The plaque reads, "J.L. Dawkins' powerful devotion to service for all citizens of Fayetteville is strongly demonstrated by his quarter century of humble public service. His intense love of people and of his city motivated him to strive for quality development and beautification of his beloved community. The profound passion of J.L. Dawkins for his city is evident in his untiring endeavors to make Fayetteville a better place for all."

In 1993, Dawkins was diagnosed with prostate cancer. His cancer went into remission following surgery and chemotherapy. However, the cancer returned in 1998. He underwent months of chemotherapy at the UNC Hospitals in Chapel Hill, North Carolina. He cited his granddaughter, Jill, who had been diagnosed with brain tumor at the age of 3, as his inspiration.

In September 1998, Dawkins announced his intention to run for re-election in 1999 during his treatment. Dawkins was re-elected to his seventh term as mayor in November 1999, winning nearly 75% of the vote. Dawkins stopped attending city council meetings beginning in February 2000 due to declining health, but he continued to work on official business from home until his death in May 2000.

Mayor J.L. Dawkins died in office at Cape Fear Valley Medical Center in Fayetteville on Tuesday, May 30, 2000, at the age of 64. He was serving his seventh term as mayor at the time of his death. Dawkins was survived by his wife, Mary Anne Evans; two children, John L. Dawkins III and Dawn Marie Caison; and four grandchildren.

Milo McBryde, the city council's Mayor Pro Tem at the time, became acting mayor following Dawkins death. In August 2000, after months of negotiations, McBryde was elected mayor by city council to fulfill the remainder of Dawkins' unexpired term. McBryde was sworn into office on August 21, 2000.
