= Beth Finch =

American politician and businesswoman

Mayor of Fayetteville, North Carolina
- In office 1975–1981
- Preceded by: Jack Lee
- Succeeded by: Bill Hurley

Personal details
- Born: 1921 Dunn, North Carolina
- Died: December 27, 2012 (aged 90–91)
- Party: Democratic
- Spouse: Tom Finch (1944–2004)
- Education: University of North Carolina at Chapel Hill

Beth Dail Finch (1921 – December 27, 2012) was an American politician and businessperson. Finch served as the first female Mayor of Fayetteville, North Carolina, from 1975 to 1981. She is the only woman to hold that office as of 2021.

Finch was born Beth Dail as the only child of Joseph and Eulah Dail in Dunn, North Carolina, in 1921. She graduated from an academy in Virginia and received a bachelor's degree from the University of North Carolina at Chapel Hill. She worked for the Dunn Dispatch and The Fayetteville Observer after college. She married her husband, Tom Finch, in 1944 and moved to Fayetteville. Her husband founded Finch Oil in 1955.

Beth Finch, a Democrat throughout her life, entered politics in the 1960s. She served on the successful 1960 gubernatorial campaign of Terry Sanford, a longtime friend. He was elected Governor of North Carolina that year.

Finch lost her first election campaign for the Fayetteville city council in 1969. However, she won election to the city council in 1971 and was re-elected to her seat in 1973. She was also elected mayor pro tem during her second term on the council.

Fayetteville's two-term Mayor Jack Lee retired from office in 1975. He suggested that Finch run to succeed him. Beth Finch won the 1975 mayoral election, becoming the city's first female mayor. As mayor, Finch replaced the city's aging public buses and outdated garbage collection methods. She became the first female president of the North Carolina League of Municipalities in 1980.

Finch stepped down from office in 1981 to return to her family's business. She was succeeded by Mayor Bill Hurley, a former colleague from the city council.

Beth Finch died on December 27, 2012, at the age of 91. Her husband, Tom Finch, died in 2004.
