= Cooper Manning =

American entrepreneur and TV personality (born 1974)

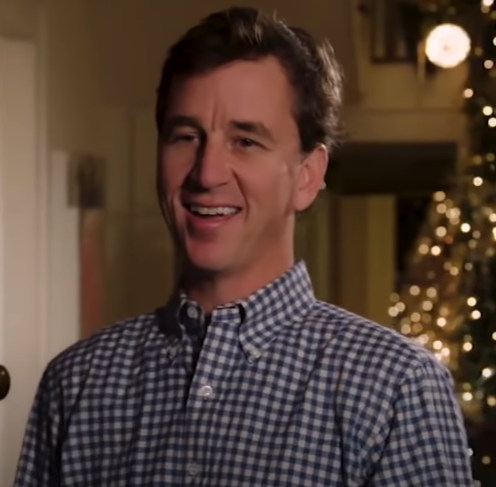
- Manning in 2018
- Born: Cooper Archibald Manning; March 6, 1974 (age 52); New Orleans, Louisiana, U.S.
- Education: University of Mississippi
- Employer: AJ Capital Partners
- Spouse: Ellen Heidingsfelder (m. 1999)
- Children: 3, including Arch
- Father: Archie Manning
- Relatives: Peyton Manning (brother); Eli Manning (brother)

Cooper Archibald Manning (born March 6, 1974) is an American entrepreneur and television personality who is the host of the television show The Manning Hour for Fox Sports as well as principal and senior managing director of investor relations for AJ Capital Partners. He is the eldest son of former professional football quarterback Archie Manning, the older brother of former professional football quarterbacks Peyton Manning and Eli Manning, and the father of Texas Longhorns quarterback Arch Manning.

== Early life ==
Born on March 6, 1974, in New Orleans, Louisiana, Manning is the first child of Archie and Olivia Manning. He played football at Isidore Newman School as a wide receiver, having a breakout season as a senior with his brother Peyton at quarterback.

Manning was a highly ranked prospect out of high school and ended up committing to the University of Mississippi, Archie's and later his brother Eli's alma mater. When practices started in the summer before school, Manning felt some numbness in his fingers and toes, so he went to the Mayo Clinic in Rochester, Minnesota, to be diagnosed. There he was told that he had spinal stenosis, a narrowing of the spine and pinching of the nerves. Manning accepted the diagnosis and immediately ended his playing career.

In honor of Cooper, Peyton donned his brother's jersey number, 18, when he began his professional career in the National Football League in 1998.

== Post-football career ==
Manning was a partner of Scotia Howard Weil, an energy investment boutique with offices in Houston and New Orleans. The firm holds an annual energy conference that attracts representatives for top-level investors, public energy companies, private energy companies, private equity firms, and other commercial lenders from around the world.

During the weeks leading up to the Super Bowl XLVII in New Orleans, he hosted his own segment on The Dan Patrick Show, titled "Manning on the Street." On September 13, 2015, Manning joined the broadcast team of Fox NFL Kickoff. In 2016, AJ Capital Partners added Manning to its executive team as principal and senior managing director of investor relations. AJ Capital Partners is a private real estate company based in Chicago, Illinois, focused on building a portfolio of hotels and resorts, most notably, the company's in-house brand, Graduate Hotels, a collection of boutique design-driven hotels in university-anchored markets across the US. Other projects have included restorations of existing hotels and development of new properties, several located in Chicago, such as Chicago Athletic Association, Soho House Chicago, Thompson Chicago, and Hotel Lincoln.

From 2021 to 2022, Manning co-hosted College Bowl alongside his brother Peyton.

He has a golf podcast called We Need a Fourth with Kenny Mayne and Brian Baumgartner, produced by SmartLess Media.

== Personal life ==
Manning has three children with his wife, Ellen: two sons, with Texas Longhorns quarterback Arch Manning the elder, and a daughter. He is Catholic, having converted to marry his wife.
