= Woodward's Gardens =

19th-century amusement park in San Francisco, California

- Previously known as The Gardens
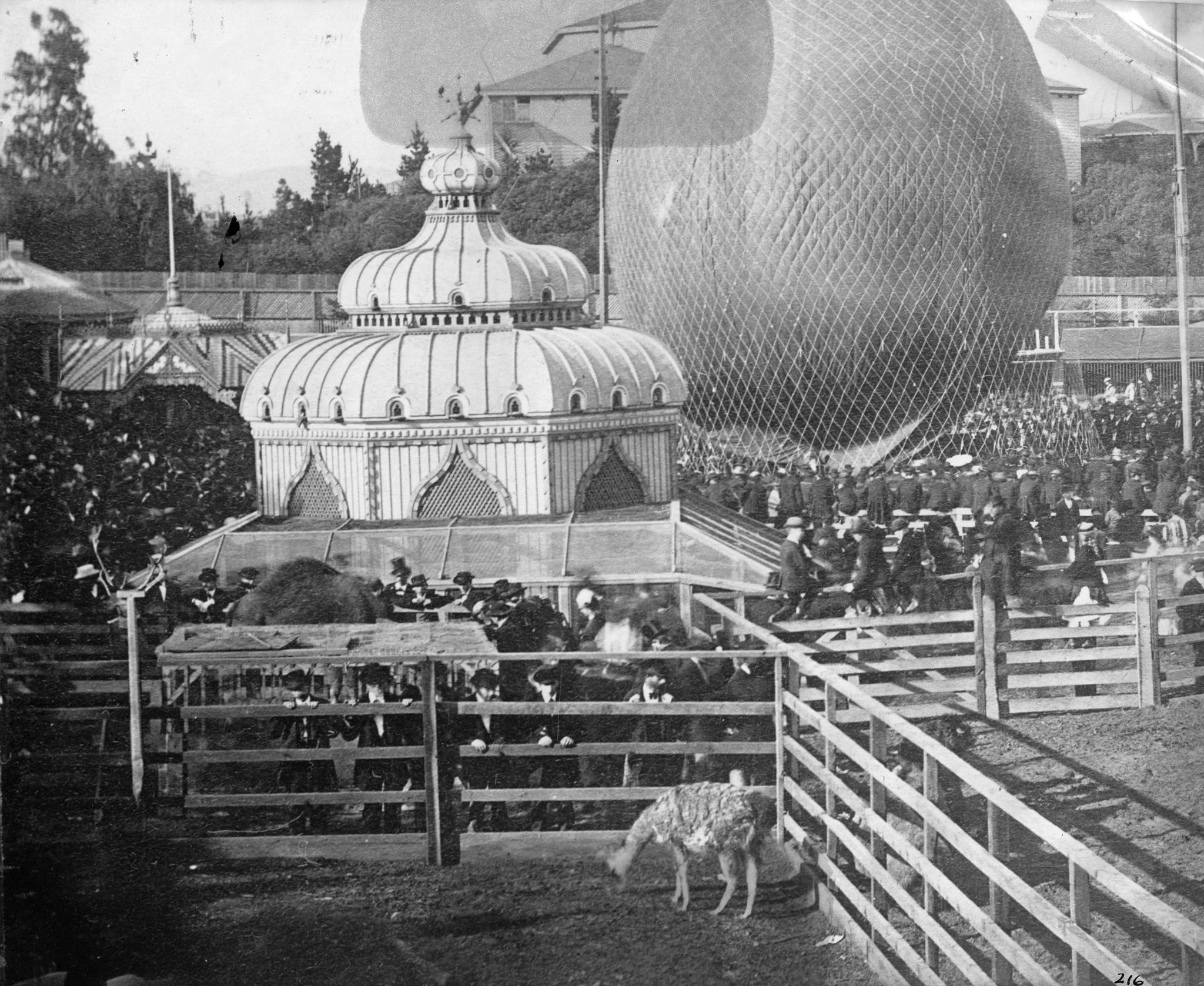
- Woodward's Gardens
- Interactive map of Woodward's Gardens
- Location: San Francisco, California, United States
- Coordinates: 37.768°N 122.421°W
- Status: Defunct
- Opened: May 1, 1866
- Closed: 1891
- Owner: Robert B. Woodward

Woodward's Gardens, commonly referred to as The Gardens, was a combination amusement park, museum, art gallery, zoo, and aquarium operating from 1866 to 1891 in the Mission District of San Francisco, California. The Gardens covered two city blocks, bounded by Mission, Valencia, Duboce, and 15th Streets in San Francisco. The site currently has a brick building at 1700 Mission Street, built after the 1906 San Francisco earthquake, which features a California Historical Site plaque, and the Crafty Fox Alehouse on the ground floor (formerly a restaurant named Woodward's Garden). The former Gardens site also features the current location of the San Francisco Armory, completed in 1914.

== History ==
Woodward's Gardens was owned and operated by Robert B. Woodward (1824–1879), who became wealthy during the Gold Rush of 1849 and through his ownership of the What Cheer House, a hotel and inn at 527-531 Sacramento Street at Leidesdorff Alley in San Francisco. Woodward opened the Gardens on the site of his four-acre estate after moving to Napa, California with his wife and four children. Early in his career, photographer Eadweard Muybridge took many photographs of the Gardens. Woodward had bought the property from U.S. Senator John C. Fremont. Woodward's Gardens opened on May 1, 1866.

In 1871, there was a series of "haunted windows" in San Francisco that made the news and were collected by Woodward and displayed in the museum. The first "haunted window" was reported on 2119 Mason Street in San Francisco, which brought crowds of spectators. An unexplained sad male face with baggy eyes was appearing for more than five days in the window, and rumors spread that it was the ghost of the home owners deceased husband. Days later, nearby on 708 Lombard Street, another house had an older male ghost in profile in the window, which also drew a crowd of onlookers.

In 1877, Miriam Leslie described Woodward's Gardens as "open to the public, who, for twenty-five cents each soul, may spend the day in rambling among shady groves, verdant lawns, flowery bosquets, lakes, streams and waterfalls, conservatories, ferneries, using the swings, the trapezes, the merry-go-rounds at will".

In 1885, two balloonists participated in a race from Woodward's Gardens that ended in the East Bay - Alvarado and Mt. Eden. The Daily Alta California reported on the "Lively Ending to the Airship Race of Sunday".

In November 1889, Woodward's Gardens housed Monarch. Monarch was one of the last known wild grizzly bears captured in California and more than 20,000 people attended the opening day on November 10, 1889.

The venue attracted up to 10,000 people on major holidays such as May Day.

== Closure and legacy ==
The facility lost popularity after Woodward's death in 1879 and closed in 1891. When the Woodward family auctioned the 75,000 objects in the collection in 1894, much of it was purchased by San Francisco philanthropist and politician Adolph Sutro. Sutro displayed some of the Woodward's Gardens collection at his Cliff House beginning in 1896 and at his Sutro Baths in the early part of the 20th century.

San Francisciana Photographs of Woodward's Gardens, a 2012 book by Marilyn Blaisdell, includes 100 photos of the site.

Woodward's Gardens

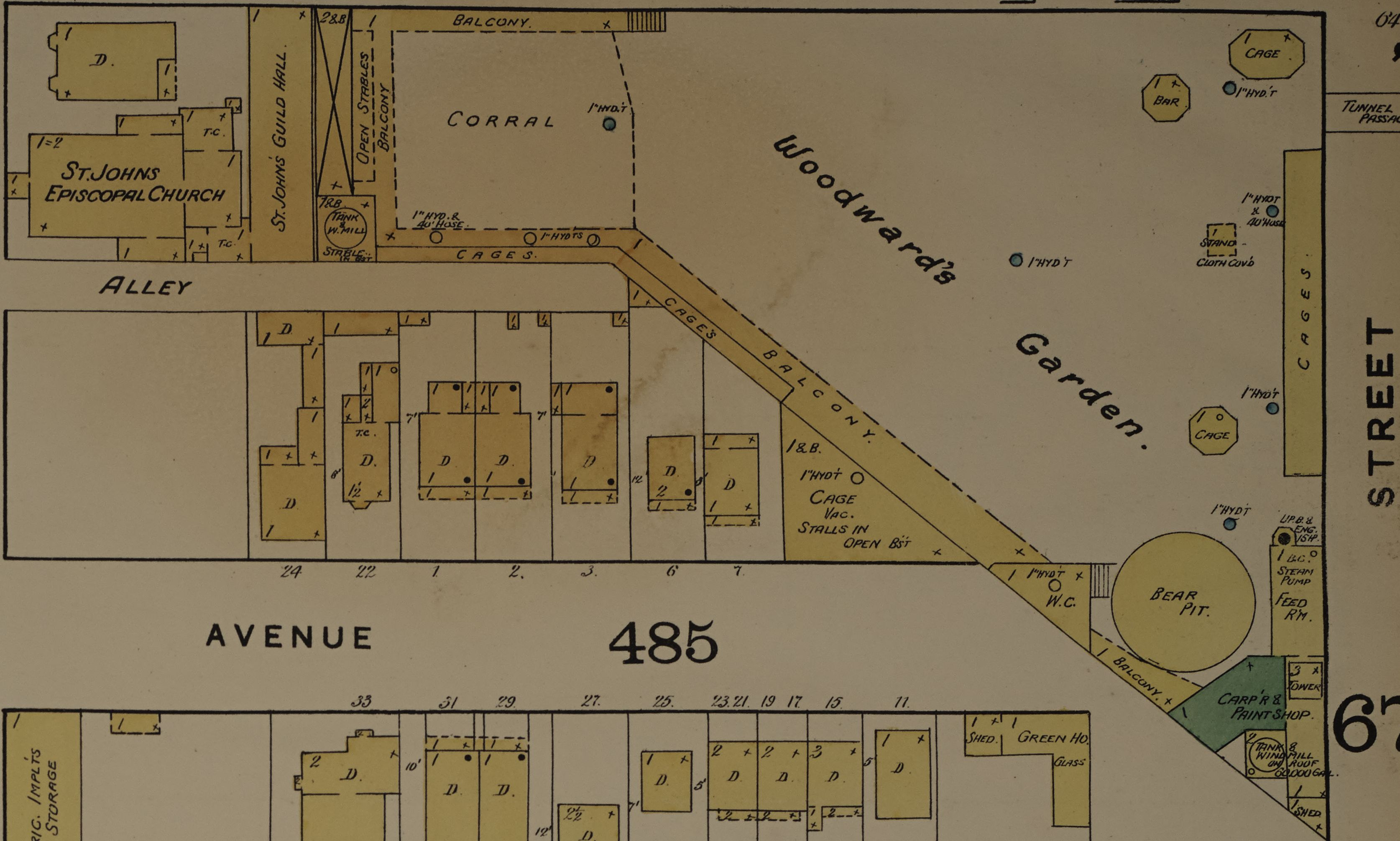
Woodward's Garden map from the 1889 Sanborn Fire Insurance Map of San Francisco

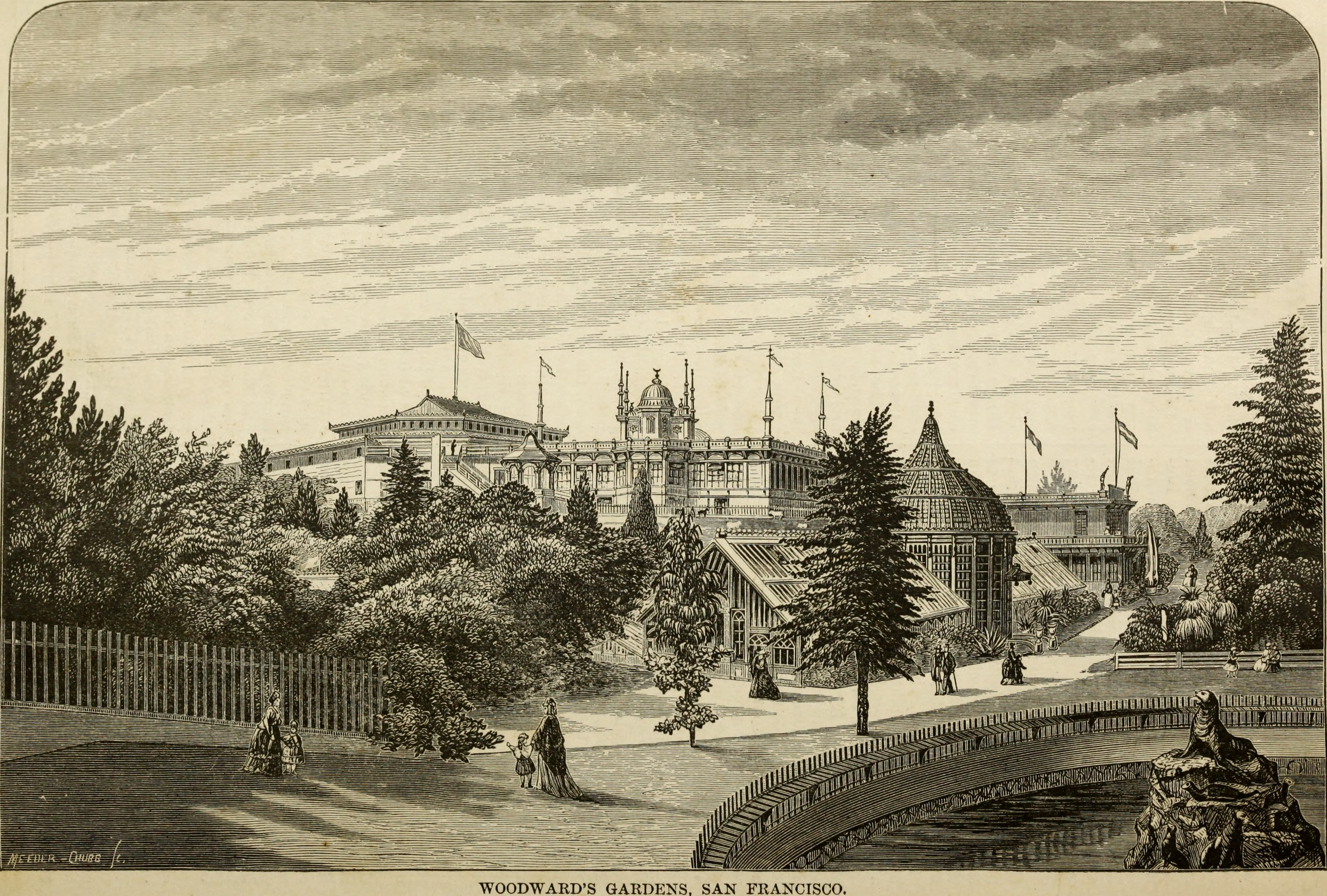
Woodward's Gardens, 1877

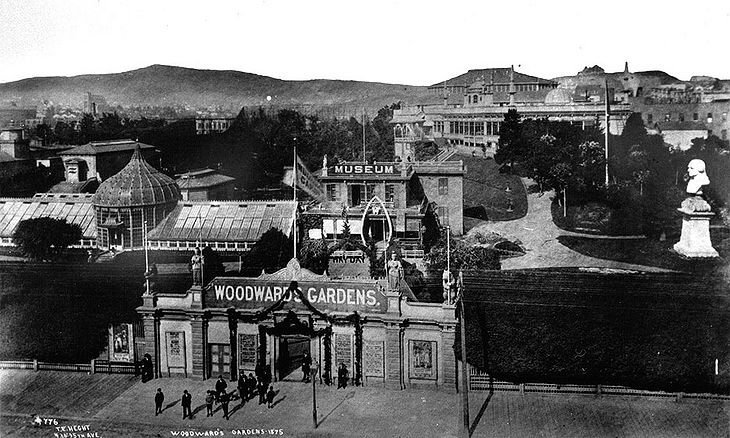
View of Woodward's Gardens

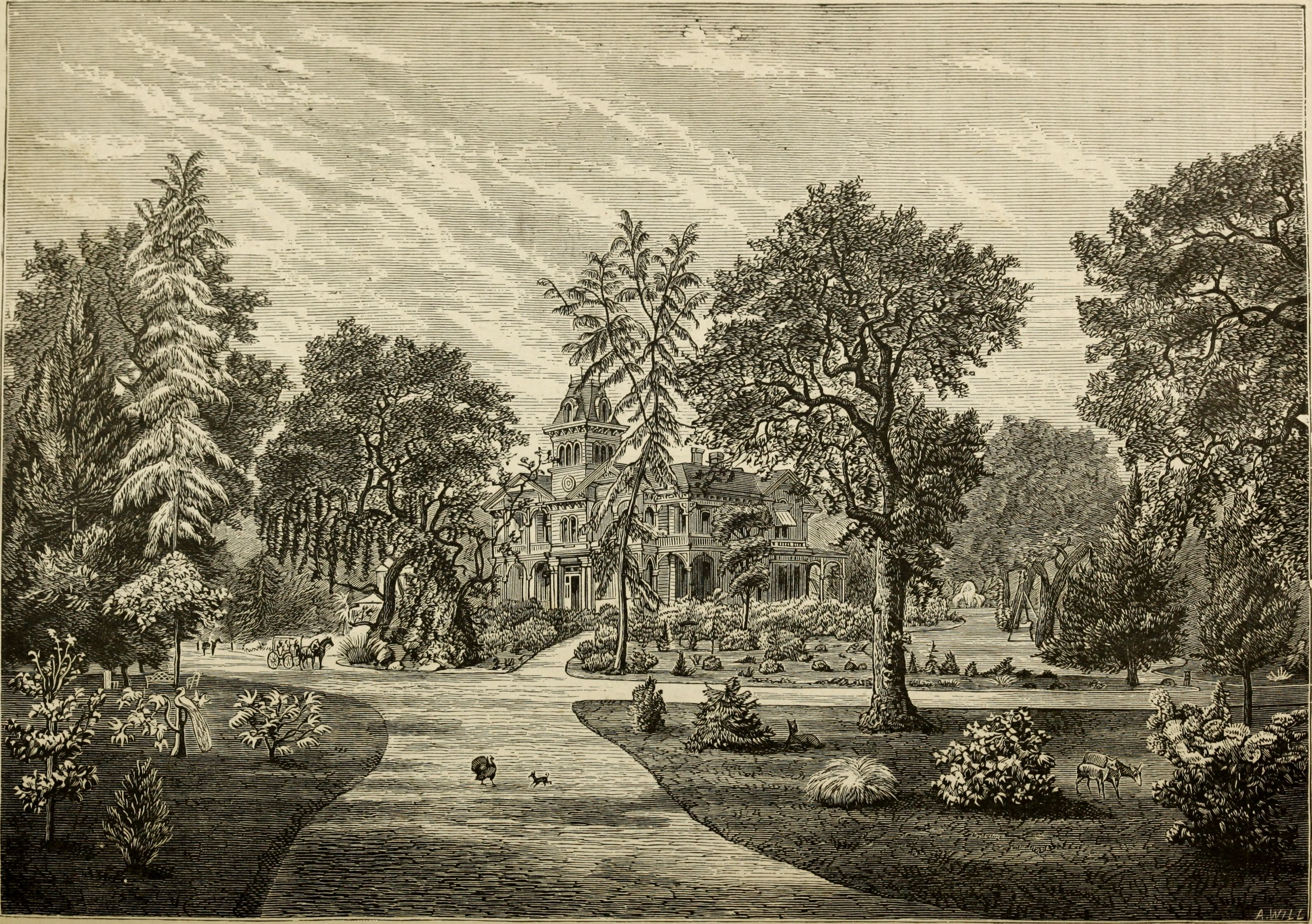
"Scene in park and pleasure grounds at Oak Knoll, Napa Valley, California. - Residence of Robert B. Woodward." from 1877 travel guide

== See also ==
- List of California Historical Landmarks
- List of San Francisco Designated Landmarks
