= San Francisco Armory =

Historic building in San Francisco, US

- 1800 Mission Street, San Francisco, CA 94103
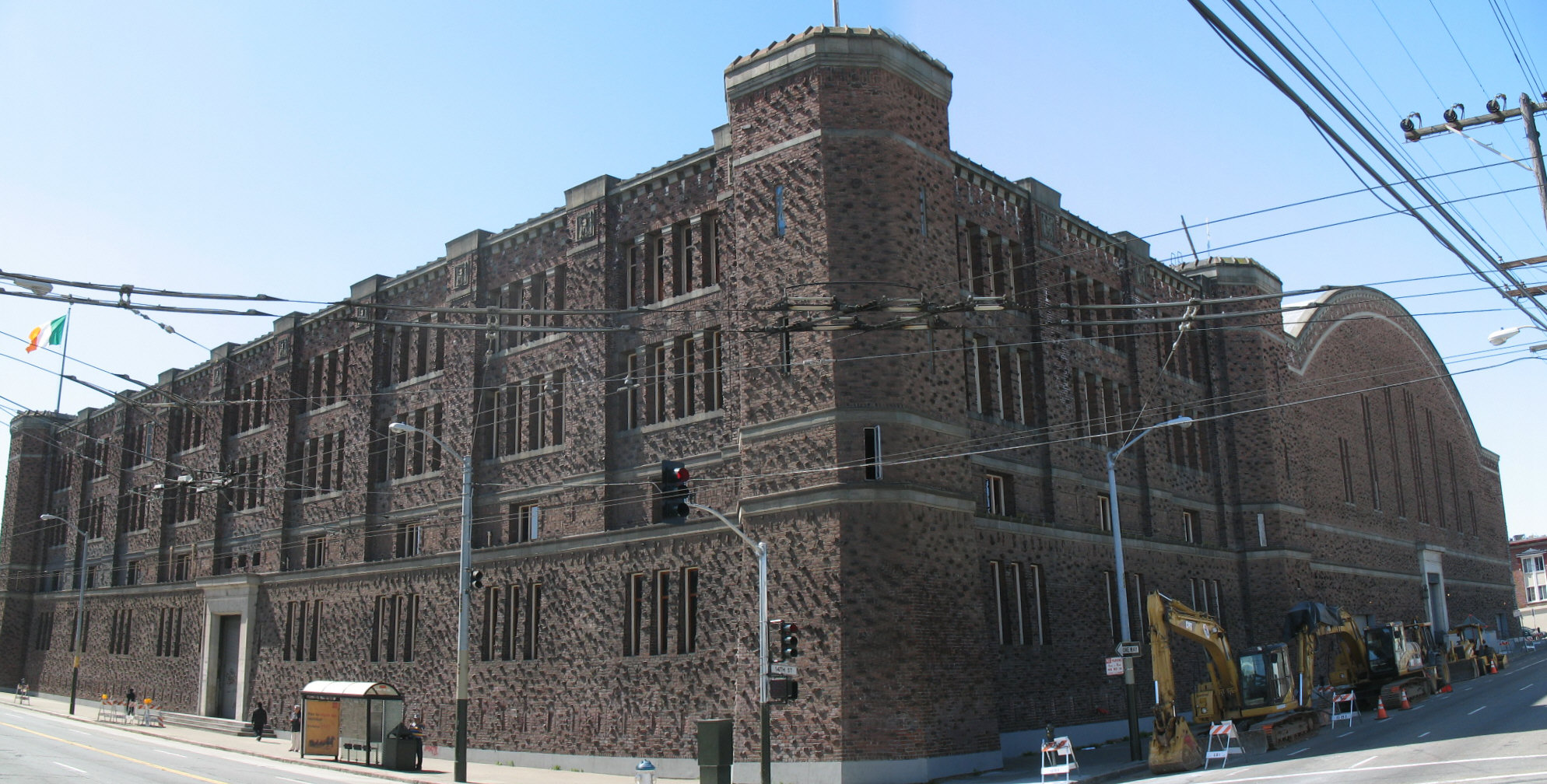
- The San Francisco Armory at the corner of Mission and 14th Streets

Site information
- Type: Armory, Arsenal
- Owner: SF Armory LLC
- Condition: Refurbished (2007)

Location
- Location in San Francisco
- Location within San Francisco County Location within California Location within the United States
- Coordinates: 37.7678°N 122.4206°W

Site history
- Built: 1912–1914
- In use: 1914–1976
- Materials: Concrete, brick facade
- Battles/wars: Bloody Thursday
- San Francisco Armory
- U.S. National Register of Historic Places
- San Francisco Designated Landmark
- Area: 2.2 acres (0.89 ha)
- Built: 1913
- Architects: Woollett & Woollett; McLeran & Peterson
- Architectural style: Moorish Revival
- NRHP reference No.: 78000758
- SFDL No.: 108

Significant dates
- Added to NRHP: November 14, 1978
- Designated SFDL: 1980

Garrison information
- Garrison: United States National Guard

The San Francisco Armory, also known as the San Francisco National Guard Armory and Arsenal or simply The Armory, is a historic building in the Mission District of San Francisco, California. Since 2018, it has been owned by SF Armory LLC, an affiliate of AJ Capital Partners.

== National Guard Armory ==
The building was constructed as an armory and arsenal for the United States National Guard in 1912–1914 and designed with a castle-like appearance in a Moorish Revival style. The Armory was built on part of the site of Woodward's Gardens (1866–1891), a zoo, aquarium, art museum, and amusement park which covered two city blocks, bounded by Mission, Valencia, Duboce, and 15th Streets. The structure was built as a replacement for the old San Francisco Armory in the Western Addition, which had been destroyed by the 1906 earthquake. In addition to its role as an armory and arsenal, during the 1920s, it served as a venue for sporting events, such as prizefights.

The Armory served as a stronghold and rallying point for the National Guard in their suppression of the 1934 San Francisco General Strike (an event known as "Bloody Thursday"). The building closed as an armory in 1976, when the National Guard moved its facilities to Fort Funston.

== Sports venue ==
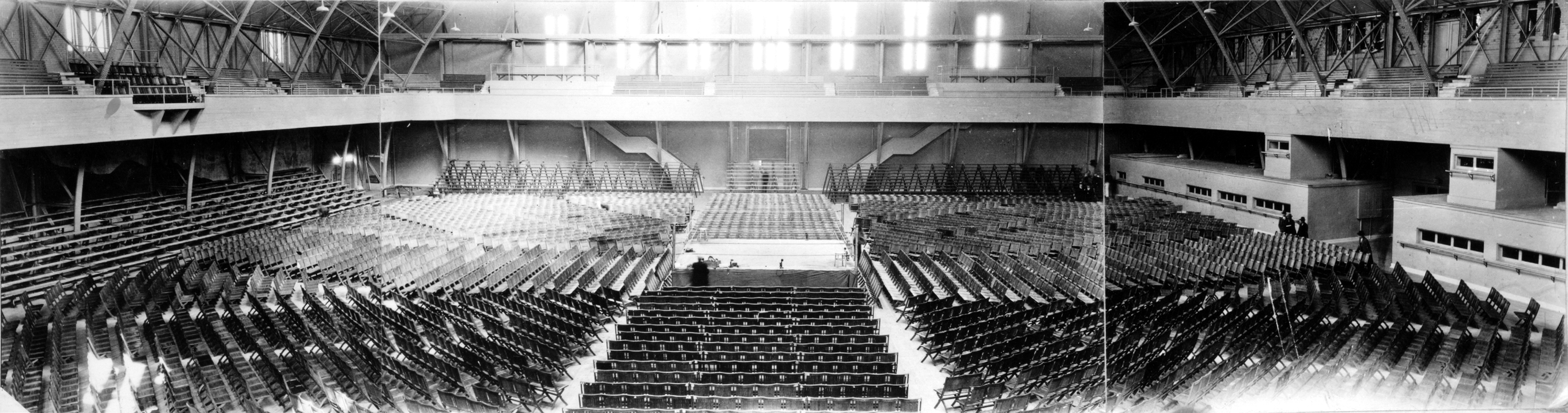
Interior of the Drill Court showing boxing ring, ca. 1928.

From the 1920s through the 1940s, the Mission Armory served as San Francisco's primary sports venue, eventually earning the nickname "the Madison Square Garden of the West." For almost three decades, at least two prizefights were held in the Drill Court each week.

One very notable fight included a light heavyweight title fight between Young Corbett III and Jackie Fields. Other notable fights that took place in the Armory included matches between Mike Teague and Jack Thompson (both were welterweight champions); and Corbett and Pete Myers in 1929.

== 1976–2006 ==
After 1976, the building was largely unused for the next 30 years, though in 1978 it was registered as a Class 2 historical landmark in the National Register of Historic Places. Several spaceship-interior scenes in the Star Wars movie The Empire Strikes Back were filmed there, and the San Francisco Opera used the large inner court of The Armory for set construction and rehearsals until the mid-1990s.

By this time, The Armory was in a heavy state of disrepair. Various uses of the building were proposed from 1996 to 2006, including self storage units, a rehabilitation clinic, a gym with a rock wall, a dot-com office park, a telecommunications switching center, luxury housing, and low-income housing.

Many of these proposals were marked by acrimonious debates between various community interests. Concerns over gentrification, social and environmental impact or the unsuitability of the structure for various uses resulted in none of the various plans for the structure reaching fruition. The building eventually came to be described, variously, as "a herd of white elephants", "cursed", and "not a friendly building". The stairs in the main entrance of the armory also became a well-known skateboarding location referred to as "3-Up 3-Down".

== Kink.com (2006–2018) ==
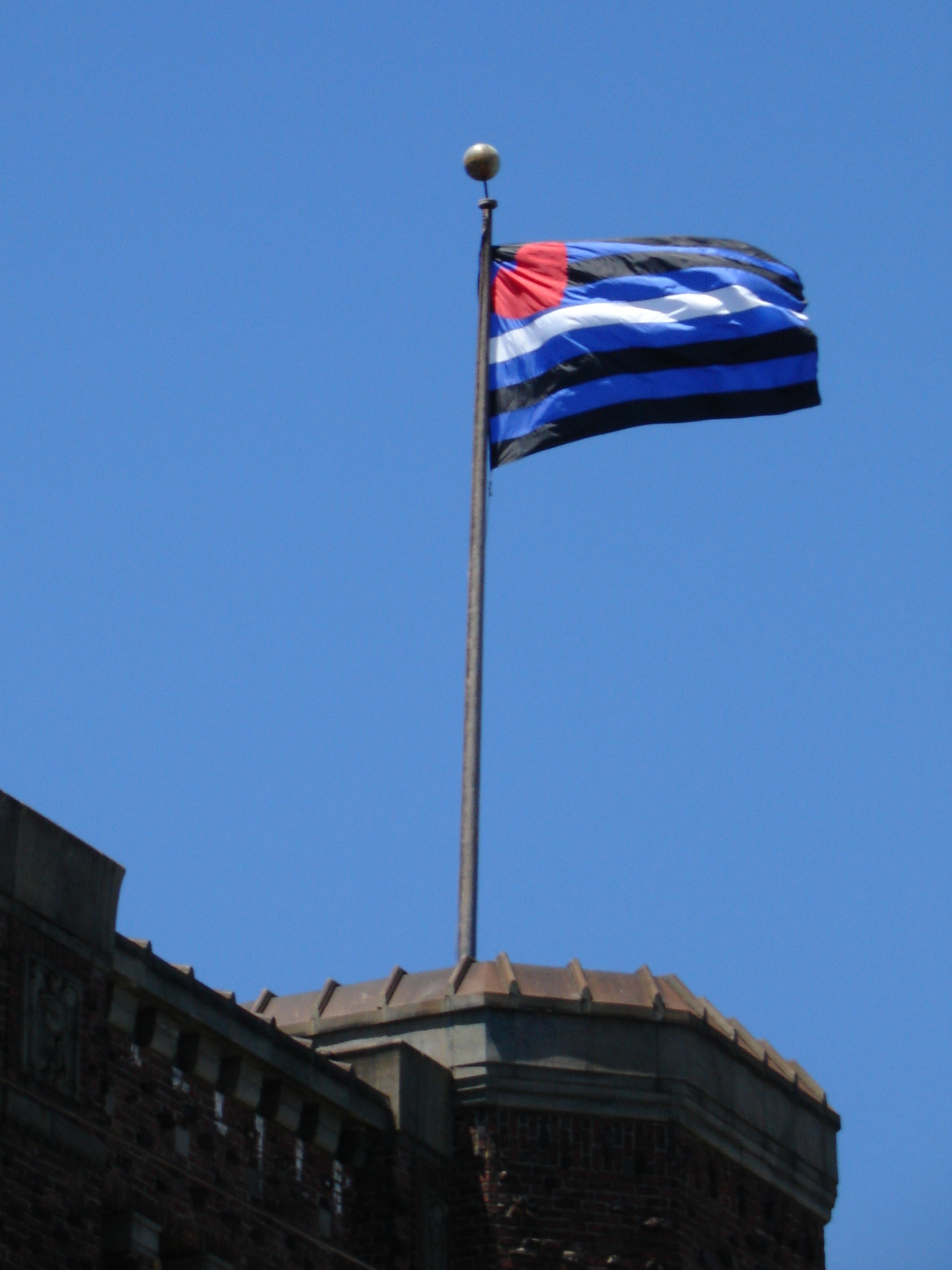
The leather pride flag waving on the Armory building in 2008.

In late 2006, The Armory was purchased for $14.5 million by Kink.com, a San Francisco-based internet pornography producer specializing in BDSM pornography. The company used the building as a studio for production of content for their websites, and began filming in 2007. Peter Acworth, the company's owner, stated that the structure suited the needs of the company very well without need for significant structural modifications to the building, and that the company would begin repairs to the decaying structure. It was also announced that Kink.com planned at some point in the future to rent out studio space for film production of all kinds within The Armory.

The sale was not announced until January 2007 as a result of a non-disclosure agreement with the previous owner. The sale drew a mixed response from the San Francisco community. Many people welcomed this use of The Armory as a way of revitalizing the structure and bringing back business to the area without altering the appearance of the historic building, as well as being in keeping with San Francisco's tradition of accommodating sexual minorities. Others were disturbed that a pornography studio would be located in the middle of a residential neighborhood near schools, or were opposed to the abandonment of plans for low-income housing at the site, as well as the lack of community input into this use of The Armory.

A group known as the Mission Armory Community Collective soon formed in opposition to Kink.com's use of The Armory; the group held a public protest in front of The Armory in early February 2007. San Franciscan mayor Gavin Newsom also expressed concern over the Kink.com purchase, and scheduled a special meeting of the San Francisco Planning Commission in March 2007 to review the company's use of the building. This public meeting was well-attended by both supporters and detractors of the Kink.com purchase. The Planning Commission for its part ruled that Kink.com was not in violation of any law or zoning requirement.

Although Kink.com stated that its activities would be invisible to the surrounding neighborhood, La Casa de las Madres, a neighboring women's shelter, announced in late March 2007 that they would be leaving the location. The shelter had planned on moving from that location in 2009 when their lease expired, but stated that they would be leaving the location because of the media scrutiny of Kink.com's presence.

As summarized in retrospect by the San Francisco Chronicle in 2018, after the initial protests "Acworth eventually won praise for the restoration work he did on the brick Moorish castle, which had long been empty".

In late 2007, Acworth approached the San Francisco Planning Commission with the idea of converting part of the Armory space into webcam-lined condominia. However, Acworth also described the plans as "extremely hypothetical" and stated that, "There is no firm plan for using the Armory for anything but a conventional film studio for now."

In May and December, 2008, the San Francisco Armory hosted Mission Bazaar, an all-ages arts fair featuring local artists and craftspeople selling their work, as well as performances. It was the first public event held in the Armory since the 1970s.

Since then, the building has housed public events and sports competitions. It was open for public tours and BDSM-related workshops.

In January 2017, Kink.com announced that it would cease the use of the Armory for film production. In 2018 the building was purchased by a Nashville real estate firm.

=== Armory Events ===
In 2011, Armory Events started work on the Drill Court, a multi-purpose event space. The venue is 40,000 square feet with an occupancy of 4,000 people, an 80 feet high dome ceiling, and 33,500 square feet of hardwood maple floating floor.

== SF Armory LLC (2018–present) ==
In January 2018, the building was sold for $65 million to SF Armory LLC, an affiliate of the Chicago-based investment company AJ Capital Partners. The new owner stated it was planning to convert the building's top two floors to office space and to lease the rest to manufacturing companies.

As of 2018, through a partnership between owner AJ Capital Partners and Skylight, a placemaking and venue development & management firm, the San Francisco Armory is available as a venue for events on a short to intermediate-term basis. Recent events have included Levi's 501 Experience; Netflix’s Stranger Things: The Experience; and Hermès' San Francisco reopening event

== Groundwater controversy ==
Guides employed by Kink.com frequently repeated the mostly inaccurate but widely held belief that a remnant portion of Mission Creek flows through the building's sub-basement.

The water in the sub-basement is groundwater which would have percolated through the soils into nearby Mission Creek during the time it existed as an open waterway. Any basement or excavation dug just as deep in the neighborhood would fill with water to a typical depth of many feet, the exact depth depending on season and rainfall factors. Pumps constantly running within the building prevent the groundwater from pooling in the sub-basement. According to Kink.com guides, groundwater completely filled the sub-basement at the time their company purchased the building.

== See also ==
- List of San Francisco Designated Landmarks
