= Omar Douglas =

American football player (born 1972)

No. 82
- Position: Wide receiver

Personal information
- Born: June 3, 1972 (age 54); New Orleans, Louisiana, U.S.
- Listed height: 5 ft 10 in (1.78 m)
- Listed weight: 170 lb (77 kg)

Career information
- High school: Isidore Newman School (New Orleans, Louisiana)
- College: Minnesota
- NFL draft: 1994: undrafted

Career history
- New York Giants (1994–1997)

Awards and highlights
- Second-team All-Big Ten (1993)

Career NFL statistics
- Receptions: 3
- Receiving yards: 23
- Total touchdowns: 1
- Stats at Pro Football Reference

Omar Douglas (born January 10, 1972) is an American former professional football player who was a wide receiver for the New York Giants of the National Football League (NFL). He played college football for the Minnesota Golden Gophers. Douglas was signed by the Giants as an undrafted free agent in 1994. He played for the Giants for 4 seasons and appeared in 18 games.

Douglas scored a late-game touchdown in a 1995 game against the Philadelphia Eagles when he recovered a fumbled punt attempt and ran it 41 yards. In 1997 he suffered a torn anterior cruciate ligament during training camp. He returned to the team the following year, but the Giants released him on August 22, 1998.

Douglas attended the University of Minnesota, where he had 130 receptions for 1,681 yards and 14 touchdowns, and set school records for season and single game touchdown receptions. He was also a sprinter for Minnesota and won the Big Ten indoor 55-meter championship in 1994.

Douglas attended Isidore Newman School in New Orleans, and he was the first Newman alumnus to play in the NFL. After his football career ended, Douglas became a business executive. His son Demetrius signed to play football for Minnesota in 2017.
