= Emanuel J. Evans =

American politician

Mayor of Durham, North Carolina
- In office 1951–1963
- Preceded by: Daniel K. Edwards
- Succeeded by: Wense Grabarek

Personal details
- Born: May 2, 1907 Plainfield, New Jersey, US
- Died: February 8, 1997 (aged 89)
- Party: Democratic
- Spouse: Sara Nachamson
- Children: Robert Evans; Eli N. Evans

Emanuel J. "Mutt" Evans (May 2, 1907 – February 8, 1997) was an American businessman and the first Jewish mayor of Durham, North Carolina. He served a then-record six terms from 1951 to 1963.

== Early life ==
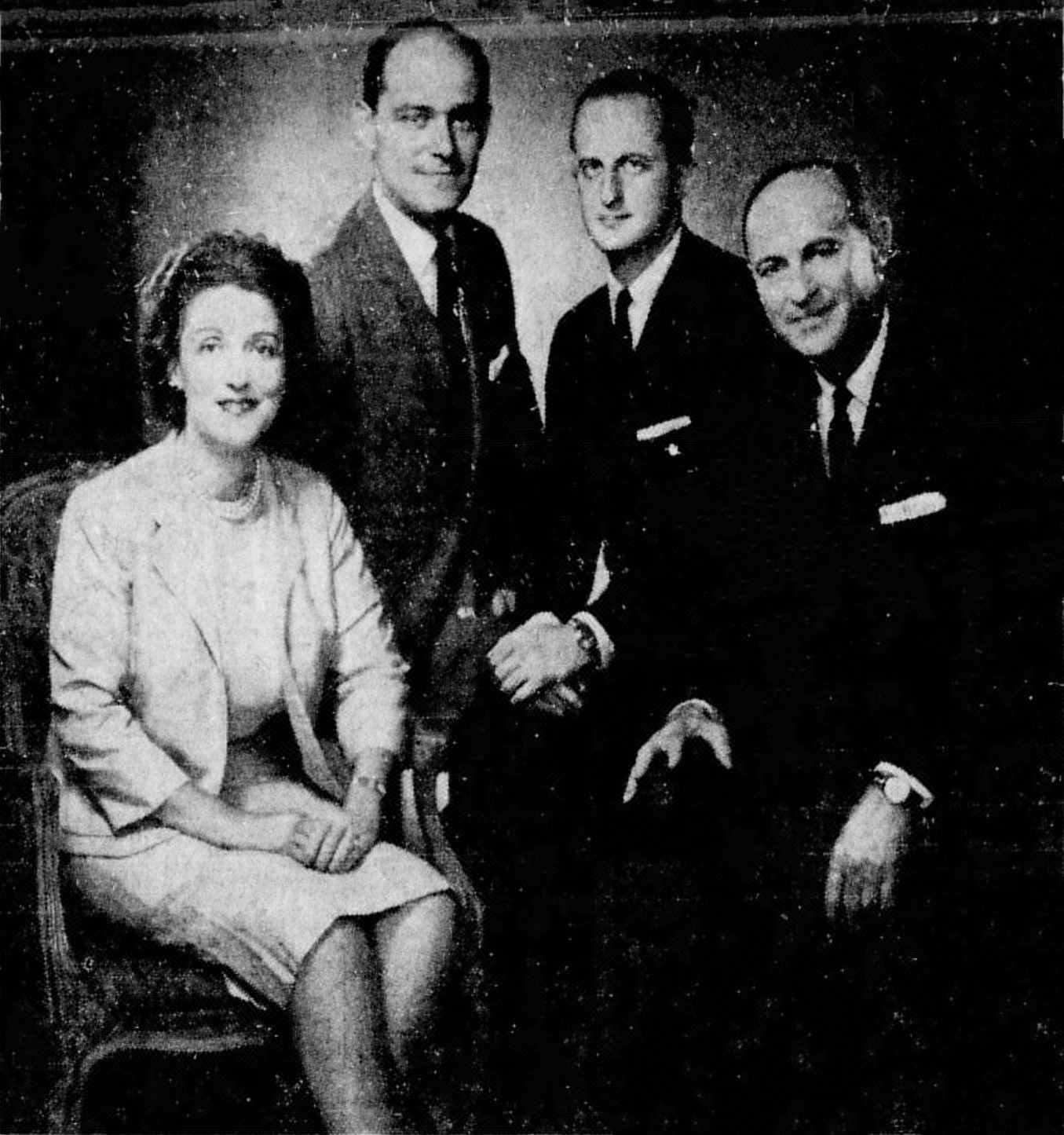
The Evans family. L to R: Mrs. Evans, Robert, Eli, and E. J. Evans.

Evans was born in Plainfield, New Jersey on May 2, 1907. He was the son of Isaac Evans and Sarah (Newmark) Evans and brother of Monroe Evans. Evans moved to North Carolina to attend the University of North Carolina at Chapel Hill, where he met Sara Nachamson, a student at nearby Duke University and daughter of retailers Eli and Jenny Nachamson, who owned the United Dollar Stores Company. Evans and Nachamson married on June 19, 1928, in Durham, where they settled, taking over the day to day business of United Dollar Stores.

== Race relations ==
Shortly after the end of World War II, the company, now Evans' United Department Stores, became the first business on Durham's Main Street to contain restrooms for African Americans, and was the site of the only integrated lunch counter in Durham. At some point in the early 1950s, Durham County Judge 'Bus' Borland ordered Evans to build a wall to separate white customers from African-American customers, in order to comply with North Carolina legal statutes. Evans responded by telling the Judge that, "you'll have to close the store, if you want me to do that", before his lawyer said that the specific statutes only applied to seated lunch counters. Evans removed the seats from the counter and raised the countertop to elbow height.

== Mayoral accomplishments ==
In 1951, Evans, a Democrat, became Durham's first Jewish mayor in an historic election. That year women were elected to the city council for the first time: Kathrine Robinson Everett and Mary Duke Biddle Trent. Contrary to expectations that Christian southerners would be biased against a Jewish candidate, Evans highlighted his leadership of his synagogue in his campaign, believing that his devotion to his religion would be respected.

As mayor, Evans led a coalition of blacks, whites, liberals and labor. His first campaign called for the rejection of “prejudice and bigotry,” and he received the black vote by an overwhelming margin of twenty to one. During his record six terms as mayor, serving until 1963, Evans oversaw the desegregation of Durham's schools, public agencies, and Police and Fire departments.

== Selling the stores ==
In 1961, after it became apparent that neither of the Evans' sons, Bob nor Eli, were interested in assuming the responsibility of managing Evans United Department Stores Company, Evans sold the chain of six stores to Belk.

Preceded by Daniel K. Edwards	Mayor of Durham, North Carolina; 1951 – 1963	Succeeded by Wense Grabarek
