= The Lonely Days Were Sundays =

1993 non-fiction book by Eli N. Evans

The Lonely Days Were Sundays: Reflections of a Jewish Southerner was a 1993 non-fiction book by Eli N. Evans, published by University Press of Mississippi.

It is the third book written by Evans.

Margaret Armbrester of the University of Alabama, Birmingham described the book as "Part autobiography, part history, primarily journalism". Melvin I. Urofsky of Virginia Commonwealth University stated that the autobiographical information is not explicitly stated as such, and is scattered around the various works.

== Content ==
The book has 31 items, including articles and reviews, with six sections containing each of the items. Almost all items originated from other publications.

There is no index and no footnotes are present.

== Reception ==
Armbrester argued that the portions about Jewish culture in the Southern United States would have the most historical value, although she said the work as a whole "is entertaining and insightful". However Armbrester criticized the lack of an index and footnotes, and stated "The book is weakest in editing and format."

Urofsky stated that The Lonely Days Were Sundays is a "well-written book" and the autobiographical information "is well worth examining."

== See also ==
- The Provincials – Another book by Evans
