= Tony Chavonne =

American politician in North Carolina

Mayor of Fayetteville, North Carolina
- In office 2005 – December 2, 2013
- Preceded by: Marshall Pitts Jr.
- Succeeded by: Nat Robertson

Anthony G. "Tony" Chavonne is an American politician, accountant and realtor. He served as the Mayor of Fayetteville, North Carolina, for four consecutive, two-year terms from 2005 until 2013. First elected in 2005, Chavonne ran unopposed in 2007. He again won re-election in 2009 and 2011. In 2013, Chavonne announced that he would not seek re-election after eight years in office.

During his tenure as mayor, the city's population expanded from 150,000 people to over 200,000 people. Chavonne attended Massey Hill Classical High School, and was inaugurated into the school's Hall of Fame in 2025.

== Sources ==
- Fayetteville City bio of Chavonne
- Project Vote Smart entry for Chavonne
- May 30, 2012 Fayetteville Observer article with detailed mention of Chavonne being mayor
- "Fayetteville Observer" article from April 2013
