= Jack Lee (politician) =

American politician (1920–2014)

Mayor of Fayetteville, North Carolina
- In office 1971–1975
- Preceded by: Charles B.C. Holt
- Succeeded by: Beth Finch

Chairman of the North Carolina Republican Party
- In office 1977–1981

Personal details
- Born: April 8, 1920 Fremont, Nebraska, U.S.
- Died: June 10, 2014 (aged 94) Farmington, New Mexico, U.S.
- Party: Republican
- Education: University of Nebraska

Jackson "Jack" Lee (April 8, 1920 – June 10, 2014) was an American radio broadcaster and politician. In 1971, Lee became the first Republican Mayor of Fayetteville, North Carolina, of the 20th Century. He served as the city's Mayor for two consecutive, two-year terms from 1971 to 1975. Lee was also elected Chairman of the North Carolina Republican Party in April 1977. He is widely credited with unifying the state Republican Party during his tenure as chairman.

== Biography ==
=== Early life and broadcasting career ===
Lee was born on April 8, 1920, in Fremont, Nebraska. His father, Earl Lee, served as a member of the Nebraska Legislature for fourteen years. Jack Lee received his bachelor's degree in 1941 from the University of Nebraska. He then served in the United States Army Air Corps in the Pacific Theater during World War II.

Lee moved to Delaware after the war, where he initially worked as a reporter for radio stations in the Delaware Beaches region. He rose to become a radio station manager.

In 1960, Lee purchased WFAI-AM (present-day WFAY), a radio station in Fayetteville, North Carolina. He moved to the city with his wife, Virginia, and their three children. Lee hired Curt Nunnery as a station radio personality.

Under Lee, WFAI-AM became the first radio station in eastern North Carolina to air daily editorials shows hosted by Jesse Helms. He publicly supported Helms' candidacy for the United States Senate in 1972.

Lee sold WFAI in the early 1970s to focus on his political career.

=== Political career ===
Lee was a conservative Republican, while the Fayetteville region was a Democratic stronghold during the 1960s. Lee became the Republican campaign manager for Cumberland County, laying the foundation for future Republican gains in the area during the 1970s.

He began his political career in 1964, when he ran unsuccessfully as a Republican candidate for a North Carolina Senate seat. Lee was soundly defeated, garnering just 30% of the vote against his Democratic opponent. Lee had later stated that he ran in 1964 so the Republican Party would at least have a candidate in that election.

Lee became the chairman of the Fayetteville Chamber of Commerce from 1965 to 1968. He was also active in a variety of other business and civic organizations.

In 1971, Jack Lee won the nonpartisan Fayetteville mayoral election by defeating city councilman Denny Shaffer in a landslide. While the election was nonpartisan, Lee made history by becoming Fayetteville's first Republican mayor of the 20th Century. U.S. President Richard Nixon appointed Mayor Lee to a national education council in 1973.

Lee was re-elected to a second, two-year term as Mayor in 1973. However, he declined to seek re-election in 1975. Lee was succeeded by Democrat Beth Finch, who became Fayetteville's first female mayor.

Jack Lee focused on joining the leadership of the North Carolina Republican Party after leaving the mayoral office. Prominent supporters of Lee included U.S. Senator Jesse Helms and political activist Thomas F. Ellis. Lee was elected Chairman of the North Carolina Republican Party unopposed at the party's conference on April 16, 1977, after his opponent, Bill Hiatt, withdrew. The state Republican Party was deeply divided at the time between rival supporters of Gerald Ford and Ronald Reagan. Lee is widely credited with unifying the North Carolina Republican Party following a long period of political infighting. Under Lee, who believed that Republican themes would appeal to the state's conservative-leaning Democrats, Ronald Reagan won North Carolina in the 1980 presidential election.

In 1983, President Reagan appointed Lee as the Federal Communications Commission's director of legislative affairs.

Lee returned to radio after retiring from politics, working at radio stations in coastal North Carolina during the 1980s and 1990s. However, he continued to work as a radio sales representative into his 80s. He eventually moved to New Mexico to be closer to his family.

Jack Lee died in Farmington, New Mexico, on June 10, 2014, at the age of 94. His health had declined since suffering from a respiratory illness during Fall 2013. He was survived by his second wife, Pam. His first wife, Virginia Lee, had died several years prior to his death.
