= Rusacks Hotel =

Hotel in St Andrews, Fife, Scotland

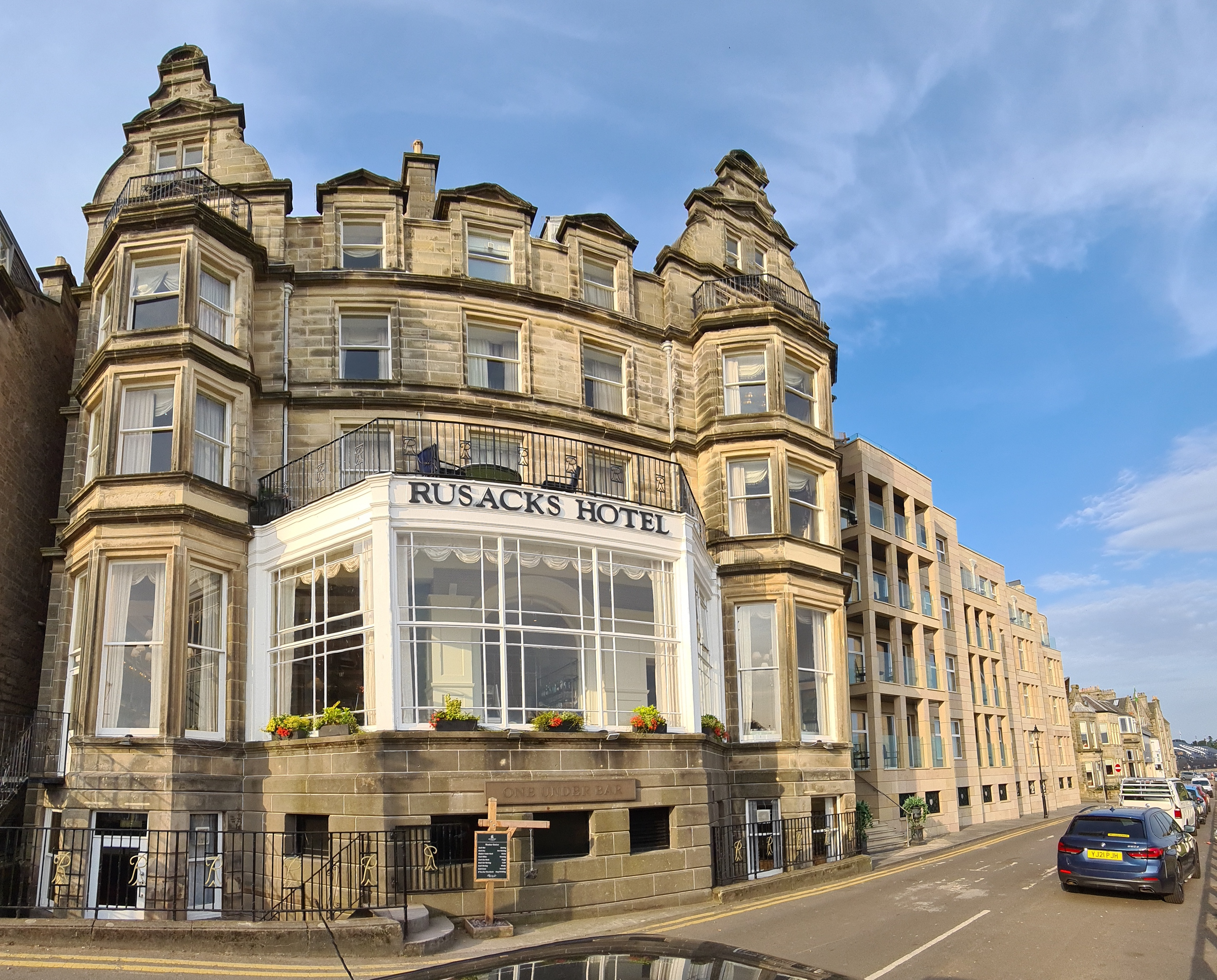
- Rusacks Hotel in July 2022
- Former names: Marine Hotel, Rusack's Marine Hotel, Macdonald Rusacks Hotel

General information
- Architectural style: Northern European Renaissance
- Location: Pilmour Links, St Andrews, Scotland
- Coordinates: 56.34263°N 2.80416°W
- Opened: 1887
- Owner: Marine & Lawn Hotels & Resorts (AJ Capital Partners)

Design and construction
- Architect: David Henry
- Architecture firm: Hall & Henry

Renovating team
- Architect: WCP Architects

Other information
- Number of rooms: 70 (114 after renovation)

Website
- Rusacks St Andrews

Listed Building – Category C(S)
- Official name: Pilmour Links, Rusack's Hotel with Boundary Walls and Piers
- Designated: 26 February 1999; 27 years ago
- Reference no.: LB45916

Marine and Lawn Rusacks, previously known as Macdonald Rusacks Hotel between 2001 and 2019, is a 5-star hotel in St Andrews, Fife, Scotland, overlooking the 1st and 18th greens on the Old Course, St Andrews Links. When it first opened in 1887 it was known as the Marine Hotel, and shortly afterwards, it became Rusack's Marine Hotel. The hotel faces both Pilmour Links and The Links thoroughfare, and overlooks the 1st and 18th greens on the Old Course. In 2021 the hotel was renovated and extended over the old car park, to increase the number of bedrooms to 120.

== History ==
Marine and Lawn Rusacks was opened in 1887, when it was known at the time as the Marine Hotel. It was built in the Free Northern European Renaissance style and designed by David Henry of Hall & Henry partnership. The hotel was owned by Johann Kristof Wilhelm Rusack (1849–1916) along with a group of Fife businessmen. Shortly after opening, the Marine Hotel became known as Rusack's Marine Hotel, and later again as Rusack's Hotel or Rusacks Hotel.

Rusack was a local farmer, owning Bogward Farm, he had originally come from Bad Harzburg in the German state of Lower Saxony. He was a German of French Huguenot extraction who came over to Britain after the Franco-Prussian War. Rusack settled in St Andrews with his Scottish wife Janet in 1874. He started by taking over a hotel at 12 Abbotsford Crescent in St Andrews, called Rusack's Private Hotel. He later went onto take over the Star Hotel at 92 Market Street, the Temperance Hotel and Kinloch House in Cupar.

After the hotel had opened, there was further construction and development between 1887 and 1893. After the main central part of the hotel was built, there were additions to the north towards The Links road in 1893, and to the south towards Pilmour Links in 1911. These additions were again mostly designed by David Henry of Hall & Henry partnership. The hotel was modernised in 1981.

During the First World War, the hotel was requisitioned by the British Army for conferences, and the hotel was used as a barracks during the Second World War. In 1981 the St Andrews Links Trust took out a mortgage on the hotel. A locker room was added for golfers to change, and in 1985, the hotel was sold at a profit. By 2001, Macdonald Hotels had taken over ownership of the hotel from Forte Heritage, when it was known as Macdonald Rusacks Hotel until 2019, when the hotel was sold to AJ Capital Partners, a private real estate company based in Chicago.

=== Hotel renovation and extension ===
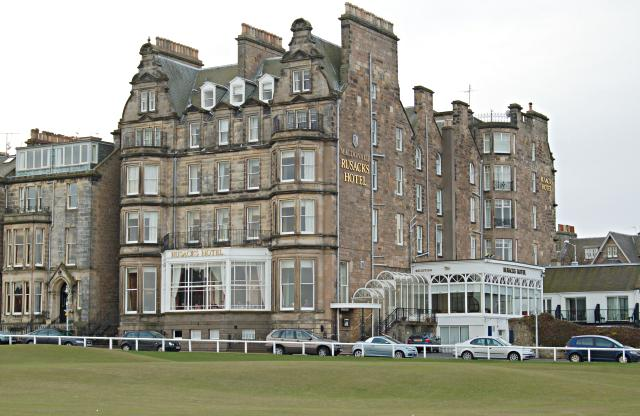
Rusacks Hotel before the renovation and extension in 2009

The 42,000-square-foot (3,900 m^{2}) £7 million six-storey extension will create 44 more bedrooms to the west of the hotel on the car park, with a 3,000-square-foot (280 m^{2}) rooftop bar and restaurant for 145 diners. The new extension to the hotel has been designed by WCP Architects. The renovation of the hotel will improve the hotel’s existing 70 bedrooms and the three existing bar and restaurant areas and meeting areas.

In 2015, Macdonald Hotels applied to Fife Council for planning permission for the new development; however, this was initially refused on the grounds of its "impact on a conservation area, negative impact on residential amenity and reduction of parking". Macdonald Hotels appealed the decision on the basis that Fife Council had failed "to give enough weight to the economic benefits of extending it". The appeal was successful later in the year and work was due to start during 2016. After the hotel was taken over by AJ Capital Partners in 2019, they began construction and renovation of the hotel in 2020, and was opened in September 2021.
