= Cool Spring Place =

Historic house in North Carolina, United States

- U.S. National Register of Historic Places
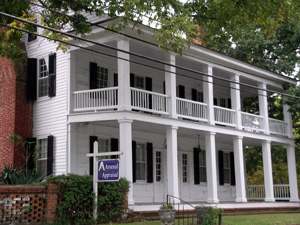
- Cool Spring Place, August 2006

- Location within North Carolina Location within the United States
- Location: 119 N. Cool Spring St., Fayetteville, North Carolina
- Coordinates: 35°3′7.5″N 78°52′26.7″W
- Area: 1 acre (0.40 ha)
- Built: 1788
- Architectural style: Federal, Federal vernacular
- NRHP reference No.: 72000956
- Added to NRHP: October 10, 1972

Cool Spring Place, also known as Cool Spring Tavern, is a historic home located at Fayetteville, Cumberland County, North Carolina. It was built in 1788, and is a two-story, five bay by four bay, rectangular Federal-style frame dwelling. It has a low hipped roof and features a double porch on the front facade. It operated as a tavern until 1795, and is believed to be the oldest existing structure in the city of Fayetteville, having survived the disastrous fire of 1831.

It was listed on the National Register of Historic Places in 1972.
