= Milo McBryde =

American politician

Mayor of Fayetteville, North Carolina
- In office August 21, 2000 – December 3, 2001
- Preceded by: J.L. Dawkins
- Succeeded by: Marshall Pitts Jr.

Acting Mayor of Fayetteville
- In office May 30, 2000 – August 21, 2000
- Preceded by: J.L. Dawkins

Frank Milo McBryde is an American politician and optician who served as the Mayor of Fayetteville, North Carolina from 2000 until 2001. McBryde became Mayor following the death of his predecessor, seven-term Mayor J.L. Dawkins, who died in office on May 30, 2000.

McBryde is the third generation of his family to be involved in Fayetteville city government. His father, Frank McBryde (1912-1990), was a community leader who served as an alderman from 1945 to 1949. McBryde graduated from Methodist University in 1968.
