= Graduate Hotels =

American hotel chain

- Type: Private
- Industry: Hospitality
- Founded: 2014; 12 years ago
- Founder: Ben Weprin
- Headquarters: Nashville, Tennessee, United States
- Number of locations: 35
- Area served: United States; England
- Parent: Hilton Worldwide
- Website: graduatehotels.com

Graduate Hotels is a collection of hotels located in college towns, primarily in the United States, launched in 2014 by Nashville-based real estate company AJ Capital Partners. In 2024, the brand was acquired by Hilton Worldwide with AJ Capital Partners retaining real estate assets. There are currently 33 operating hotels in the United States and two in England.

== History ==
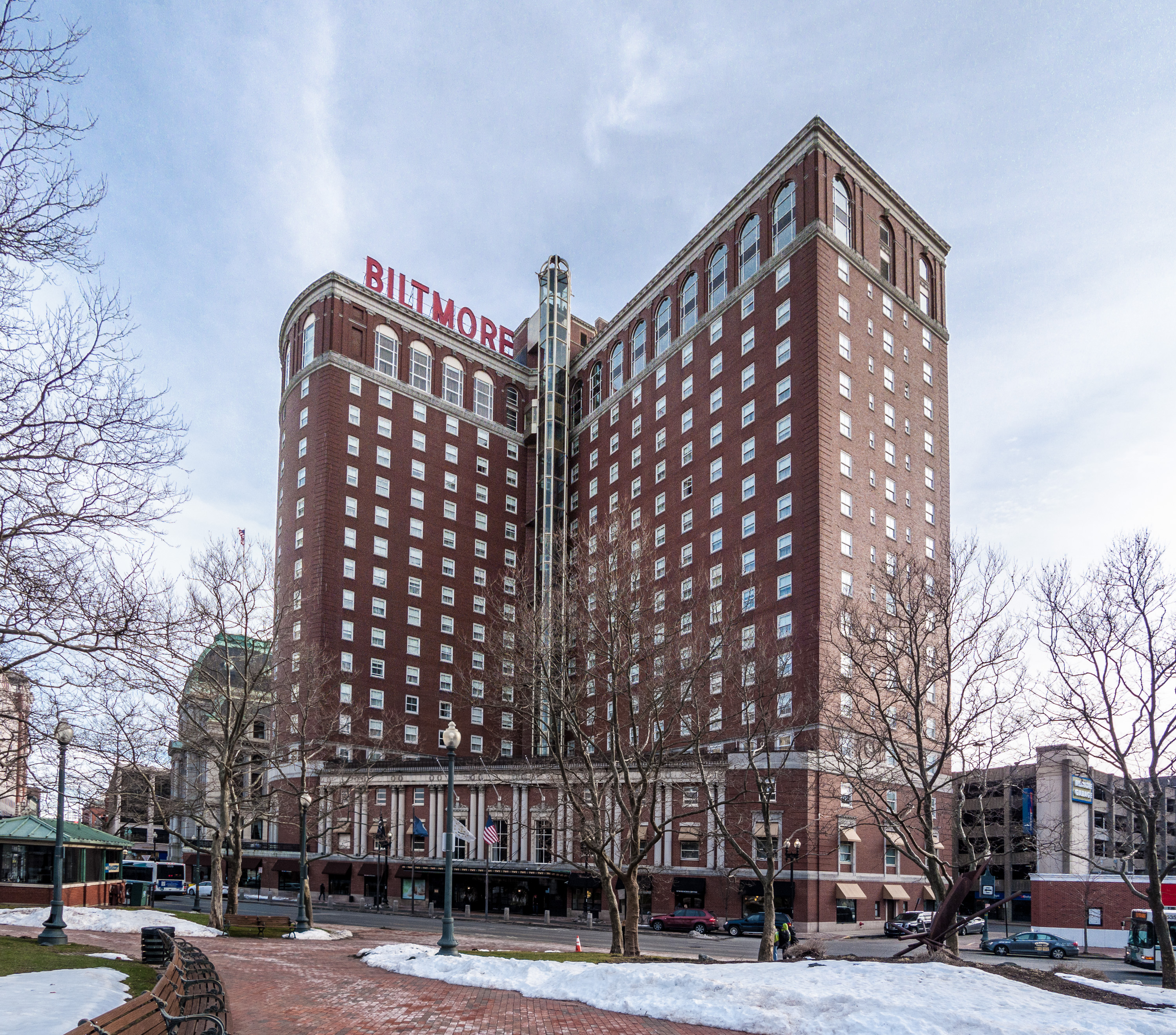
The Graduate Providence originally opened in 1922 as the Providence Biltmore

Graduate Hotels was founded in 2014 by Nashville-based real estate investor Ben Weprin and his firm, AJ Capital Partners. The company launched the Graduate Hotels brand by acquiring and remodeling hotels in university-anchored towns across the country. The first hotel opened in Athens, Georgia in 2014, centered around the University of Georgia.

Hilton Worldwide agreed to acquire Graduate Hotels in March 2024, after which the brand was renamed Graduate by Hilton. AJ Capital Partners retains real estate ownership of the existing Graduate properties under long-term franchise agreements with Hilton.
