= Eli N. Evans =

Jewish-American author (1936–2022)

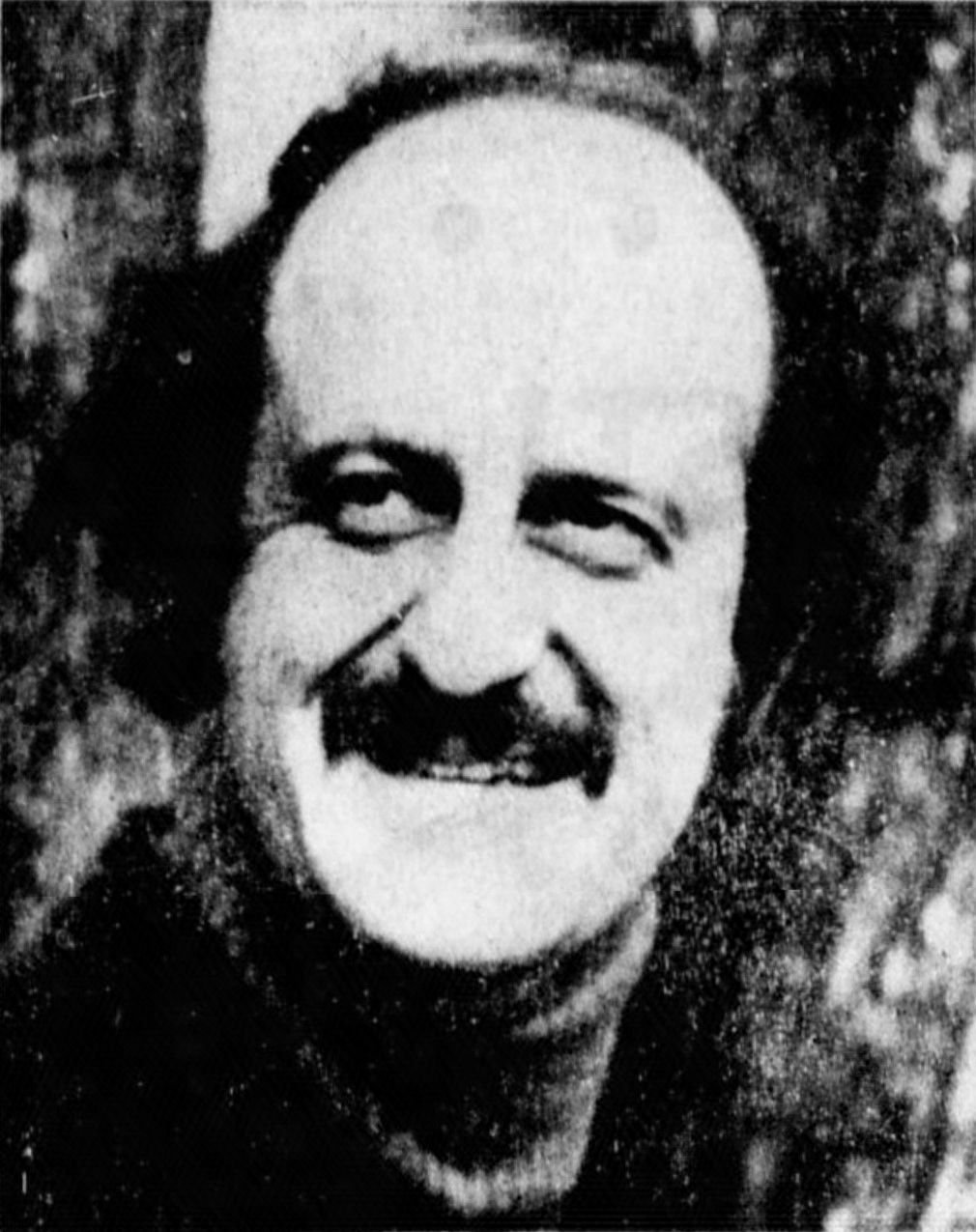
- Photograph of Evans from The Charlotte Observer in 1973
- Born: Eli Nachamson Evans; July 28, 1936; Durham, North Carolina, U.S.
- Died: July 26, 2022 (aged 85); Manhattan, New York, U.S.
- Education: University of North Carolina (B.A.); Yale Law School (J.D.)
- Occupations: Author, charity administrator
- Spouse: Judith London (m. 1981; died 2008)
- Children: 1
- Writing career
- Language: English
- Years active: 1971–2010

Eli Nachamson Evans (July 28, 1936 – July 26, 2022) was an American author from North Carolina whose work encompassed explorations of the Jewish experience in the Southern United States. He "left his biggest mark as the author of three books exploring the culture and history of Jews in the American South", according to his August 2, 2022, New York Times obituary.

== Early life and education ==
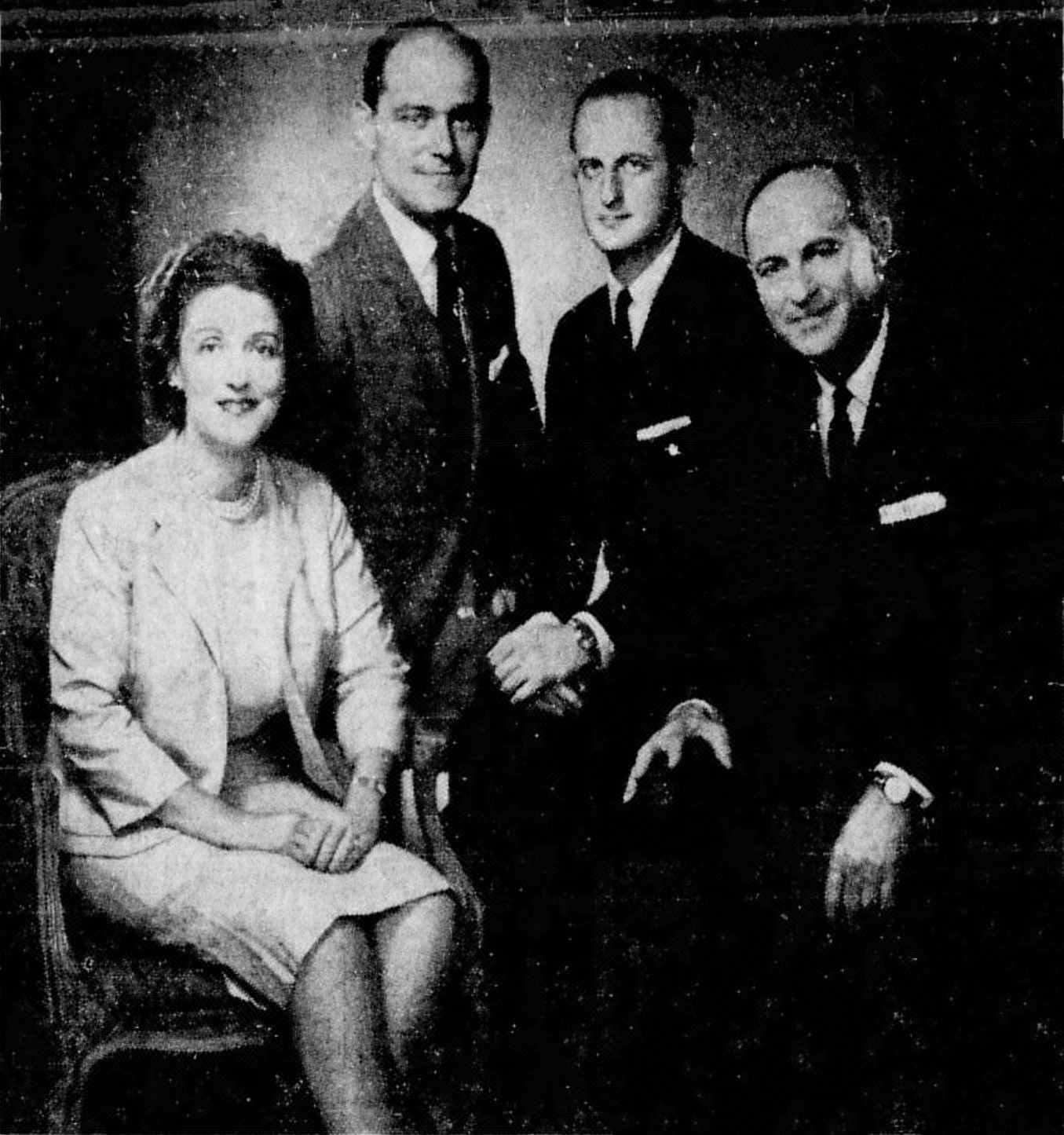
The Evans family of Durham, North Carolina, in 1965. From left to right: Evans' mother, Robert, Eli, and his father Emanuel

Evans was the son of Emanuel J. Evans, an American businessman and the first Jewish mayor of Durham, North Carolina, and Sara Nachamson. She was a daughter of retailers Eli and Jenny Nachamson, who owned the United Dollar Stores Company.

He received a B.A. in English literature from the University of North Carolina in 1958, where he joined the Tau Epsilon Phi fraternity, and served as "the first Jewish president of the student body." He served in the United States Navy for two years, stationed in Japan. In the fall of 1958, he completed the Navy Supply Corps School as an ensign and was assigned to the USS Saint Paul (CA-73). After serving in the Navy, he went to graduate school, receiving a J.D. from Yale Law School in 1963.

== Career ==
After stints as a White House speechwriter for President Lyndon B. Johnson, and as an aide to North Carolina Governor Terry Sanford, Evans took a position with the Carnegie Corporation of New York in New York City.

In 1971, he published The Provincials: A Personal History of the Jews of the South, which "set off a wave of interest in a culture that many people outside the region never knew existed". Evans became president of the Charles H. Revson Foundation in 1977. He published a 1989 biography of Judah P. Benjamin, a United States Senator from Louisiana and Secretary of State of the Confederacy, who was the first Jew to hold a Cabinet position in North America and the first to be elected to the United States Senate who had not renounced his faith, followed by an anthology of personal stories in 1993.

He was elected to the American Academy of Arts and Sciences in 2001.

== Personal life ==
In 1981, Evans married Judith London of Montgomery, Alabama, who he met in New York City, and with whom he remained until her death in 2008. They had one son, Joshua.

Evans died at a Manhattan hospital from complications of COVID-19, two days before his 86th birthday.

== Works ==
- The Provincials: A Personal History of Jews in the South (New York: Antheneum, 1973) —Reprinted, 1997 and 2005.
- Judah P. Benjamin: The Jewish Confederate (New York: The Free Press, 1988). ISBN 0-02-908880-1.
- The Lonely Days Were Sundays: Reflections of a Jewish Southerner (1993).
- Overview: The War Between Jewish Brothers in America, in Jews and the Civil War: A Reader (eds. Jonathan D. Sarna & Adam Mendelsohn; NYU Press: 2010).
