= AJ Capital Partners =

American real estate company

Adventurous Journeys Capital Partners ("AJ Capital Partners") is an American real estate company based in Nashville, TN with a portfolio that focuses on the hospitality, mixed-use, and residential sectors.

== History ==
AJ Capital Partners was founded by Ben Weprin, the current CEO, in 2008. Other projects have included restorations of existing hotels and development of new properties, several located in Chicago and Nashville, such as Chicago Athletic Association, Soho House Chicago, Thompson Chicago and Hotel Lincoln, as well as Thompson Nashville.

In 2012, AJ Capital Partners collaborated with Soho House Group to develop a rubber belt factory in Chicago's West Loop into a Soho House, an urban, members only club and hotel.

The company launched the Graduate Hotels chain in 2014, later selling it to Hilton Worldwide in 2024.

In 2021, AJ Capital Partners announced Marine & Lawn Golf Hotels, a collection of bespoke properties located adjacent to the world’s most distinguished golf courses. The platform includes Rusacks St Andrews overlooking the Old Course in Scotland.

In 2023, AJ Capital Partners announced Memoir Residential, a novel approach to contemporary urban living, and Field & Stream Lodge Co., a joint venture with Starwood Capital Group backed by the legacy and expertise of the Field & Stream brand.

In 2024, AJ Capital sold Graduate Hotels to Hilton Worldwide, retaining ownership of all real estate for the existing hotels. The company additionally continues to operate all hotels. Further, in 2024, AJ Capital announced the acquisition and restoration of Coral Sands Inn & Cottages, an iconic property on Harbour Island in the Bahamas.

Additional active projects include Wedgewood Village in Nashville, TN; Belle Meade Village in Nashville, TN; Little River in Miami, FL; and more.

== Awards ==
- Condé Nast Traveller Gold List 2026 – Coral Sands Inn & Cottages
- Fast Company Most Innovative Companies of 2025 – AJ Capital Partners
- Travel + Leisure 100 Best New Hotels 2024 – Slieve Donard – Marine & Lawn Hotels & Resorts
- Travel + Leisure 100 Best New Hotels 2022 – Rusacks St Andrews – Marine & Lawn Hotels & Resorts
- Fast Company Most Innovative Companies of 2018 – Graduate Hotels
- Inc. Magazine 2017 Design Awards, Best Interior Design – Graduate Hotels
- Fast Company Most Innovative Companies of 2016 – AJ Capital Partners
- Urban Land Institute Chicago’s Catalytic Redevelopment 2016 – Chicago Athletic Association
- James Beard Foundation Outstanding Restaurant Design Finalist 2016 – Cherry Circle Room – Chicago Athletic Association
- James Beard Foundation Outstanding Restaurant Design Finalist 2016 – Cindy’s – Chicago Athletic Association
- National Trust for Historic Preservation Driehaus Preservation Award 2015 – Chicago Athletic Association
