= The Provincials =

Jewish Culture in USA

The Provincials: A Personal History of Jews in the South is a 1973 non-fiction book by Eli N. Evans, published by Atheneum Books. It describes Jewish culture in the Southern United States. It was later re-published by University of North Carolina Press.

Steven Hertzberg of the University of Chicago stated that the book was aimed at the general public and not specifically for academics.

There was an updated edition in 2005 that has photographs of the author's family.

== Background ==
According to Hertzberg, the work "based entirely on" Evans' life events, interviewing, and secondary sourcing.

== Contents ==
The author stated that a poll that concluded that the Southern United States had the most negative attitudes towards Jewish people was untrue.

The book also has family recipes.

== Reception ==
Stephen Birmingham wrote that the book is "thoroughly absorbing" and "often very funny".

Hertzberg stated that the listing of works cited was usually "useful", and that, in the original printing, some "factual errors and oversimplifications" were made in the work, with Hertzberg citing statements about the Leo Frank incident.

Judy Chermak of the Baltimore Jewish Times stated that the 2005 version support's the author's "reputation as the premier chronicler of life in the Jewish South."

Lillian Hellman, in The New York Times, stated that the book has "interesting" content about Jewish life in parts of the United States; she argued that the book had too much focus on wealthy people and "takes their problems as Jews too seriously", and also that the content talking about Evans's family "deprive him of the space, or perhaps the inclination, to dig very deep into the rest of the South."

Joakim A. Isaacs of Marymount College stated that the work "has value in gaining insight into the mind and heart of southern Jews", and that the writer was "highly defensive of the South".

== See also ==
- The Lonely Days Were Sundays - Another book by Evans
