= Bill Hurley =

American football player (born 1957)

No. 28, 47
- Position: Safety

Personal information
- Born: June 15, 1957 (age 69); Kenmore, New York, U.S.
- Listed height: 5 ft 11 in (1.80 m)
- Listed weight: 195 lb (88 kg)

Career information
- High school: St. Joseph's Collegiate Institute (Tonawanda, New York)
- College: Syracuse
- NFL draft: 1980: 4th round, 110th overall pick

Career history
- Pittsburgh Steelers (1980)*; New Orleans Saints (1982); Buffalo Bills (1983)
- * Offseason or practice squad member only

Awards and highlights
- First-team All-East (1979); Second-team All-East (1977)

Career NFL statistics
- Interceptions: 1
- Fumble recoveries: 2
- Stats at Pro Football Reference

William J. Hurley Jr. (born June 15, 1957) is an American former professional football player who was a safety in the National Football League (NFL). Hurley played college football for the Syracuse Orange, starting at quarterback. Hurley was selected by the Pittsburgh Steelers in the fourth round of the 1980 NFL draft, and converted to playing safety. He later played for the New Orleans Saints and Buffalo Bills.
