= List of mayors of Fayetteville, North Carolina =

The office of the Mayor of Fayetteville, North Carolina is elected for a two-year term. The city's mayoral and municipal election are held during off-years. The mayoral election is nonpartisan. The office has been held by Mitch Colvin since 2017. He is the chief legislator of the city of Fayetteville, though as a first among equals, as Fayetteville is a Council-Manager city.

== History ==
J. W. Walker was the first mayor of Fayettesville.

"The Story of Fayetteville and the Upper Cape Fear" was written by John Oates and published in 1950. All twelve consecutive Mayors who have held office since 1961 have signed a copy.

== Mayors of Fayetteville ==
=== Pre 1961 ===
- James Dobbin McNeill (6 times pre 1927)
- Thomas J. Powers (1907-1908).
- John Underwood (1914 & 1919).
- Henry Elliot Williams (1920-1921).
- Edwin Robeson MacKethan (1921-1923).

=== Since 1961 ===
Mayor	Term begins	Term ends	Political party	Notes
Robert Butler	1961	1963	Democratic Party	
Wilber Clark	1963	1965	Democratic Party	
Monroe Evans	1965	1969	Democratic Party	First Jewish mayor of Fayetteville
Charles B.C. Holt	1969	1971	Democratic Party	
Jack Lee	1971	1975	Republican Party	First Republican mayor during the 20th Century
Beth Finch	1975	1981	Democratic Party	First woman to serve as Mayor of Fayetteville
Bill Hurley	1981	1987	Democratic Party	
J.L. Dawkins	1987	May 30, 2000		Died in office on May 30, 2000 Longest-serving mayor in city history.
Milo McBryde	August 21, 2000	December 3, 2001		Appointed mayor in August 2000 to serve the remainder of Dawkins' unexpired term. Defeated for re-election on November 6, 2001.
Marshall Pitts Jr.	December 3, 2001	December 2005	Democratic Party	First African-American mayor of Fayetteville. Defeated for re-election in November 2005.
Tony Chavonne	December 2005	December 2, 2013	Democratic Party	
Nat Robertson	December 2, 2013	December 4, 2017	Republican Party	
Mitch Colvin	December 4, 2017	Incumbent	Democratic Party	

== See also ==
- Timeline of Fayetteville, North Carolina
