= Newman Center =

Catholic ministry at educational institution

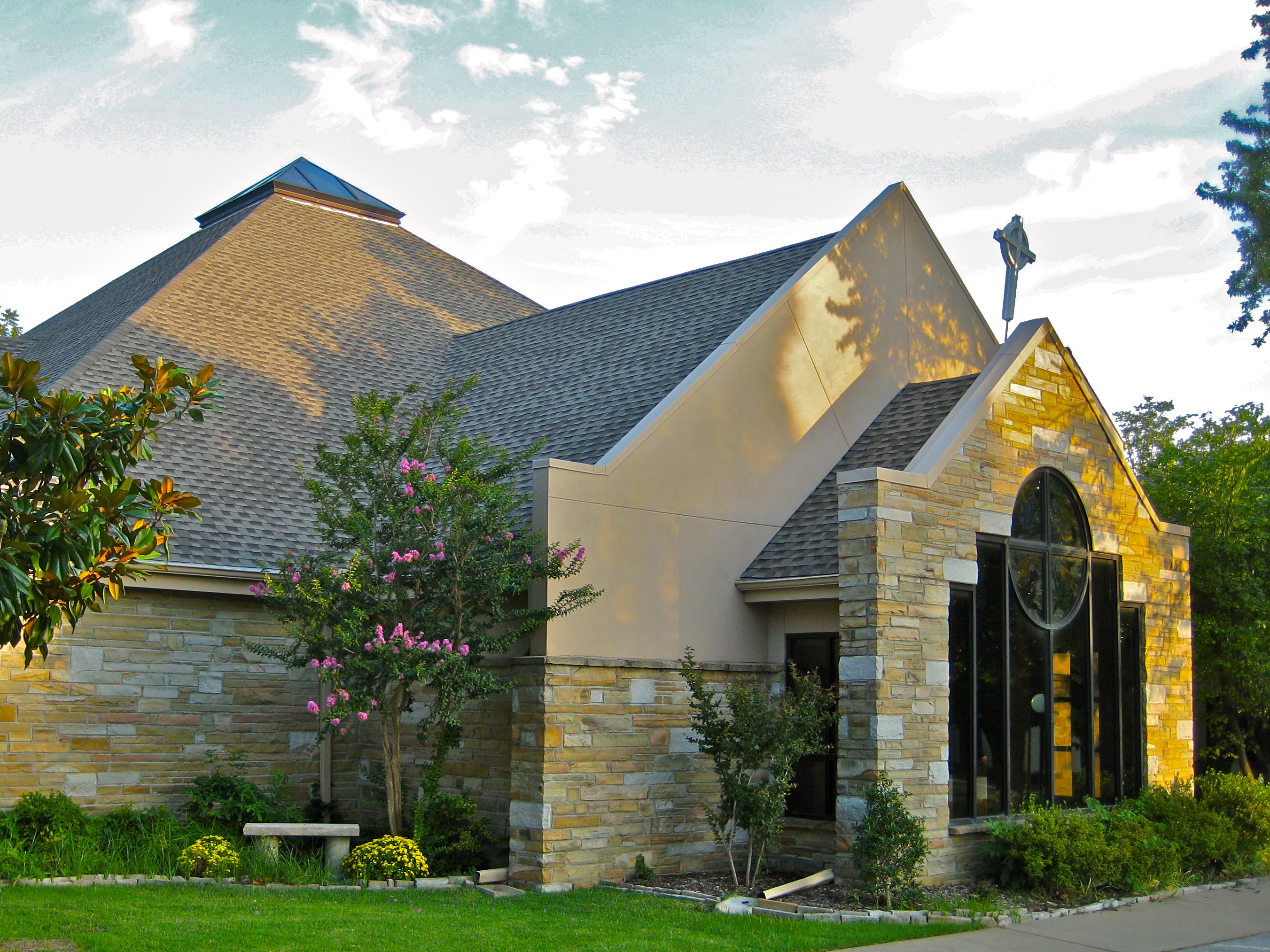
St. Philip Neri Newman Center at the University of Tulsa

Newman Centers, Newman Houses, Newman Clubs, or Newman Communities are Catholic campus ministry centers at secular universities. The movement was inspired by the writings of Cardinal John Henry Newman encouraging societies for Catholic students attending secular universities.

These centers may include residential living space or may be actual houses close to the campus with or without a chapel. Activities vary among centers but usually include both spiritual worship like Sunday Mass and Eucharistic adoration, social get-togethers (like movies or coffee socials), and group outings (like apple picking, March for Life events, and amusement park visits).

== History ==
The first Newman club was established at Oxford University by Hartwell de la Garde Grissell in 1878 as Oxford University Catholic Club, which was renamed in 1888 the Oxford University Newman Society.

The “Newman Movement” in the United States began in 1883 at the University of Wisconsin when Catholic students joined to form the Melvin Club, named after their hosts, Mr. and Mrs. John C. Melvin. The first Newman Club in America was established in 1893 at the University of Pennsylvania by Timothy Harrington, a graduate medical student and former member of the Wisconsin group, together with John Gilbride, James and Joseph Walsh with assistance of Father P. J. Garvey, pastor of the local St. James Catholic Church. The club provided social activities, discussions on the faith, and mutual support for Catholic students in a sometimes hostile academic environment. The meetings were occasions to experience Catholic culture in a secular environment.

Cornell had one of the first Newman Clubs, organized in 1888. The Newman Club eventually became a full-fledged campus parish, the Cornell Catholic Community.

In the early 1900s, the majority of Catholic college students attended private Catholic institutions. However, over time, a growing number of Catholics began attending secular universities. Initially, small chapels were opened near the campuses of the secular universities.

In 1908, the Catholic clubs began an association which became the National Newman Club Federation. In 1950, the National Newman Chaplains Association was established for ordained chaplains at non-Catholic colleges and universities. In 1969, the National Newman Chaplains Association became Catholic Campus Ministry Association (CCMA).

According to The Newman Connection, a US Catholic Church Campus Ministries non-profit organization, there are over 2,000 Newman Centers in the United States.

== Ministry and services ==
The centers provide pastoral services and ministries to their Catholic communities, in particular to the Roman Catholic student population within the universities. However, since these centers are located on university campuses, those of other Christian denominations often come and participate as well. A variety of university and parish related meetings and social events take place at the centers, as well as personal events including Catholic weddings, anniversary celebrations, baptisms, Masses, and funeral receptions.

== United States ==
Examples of campuses with Newman Centers include:

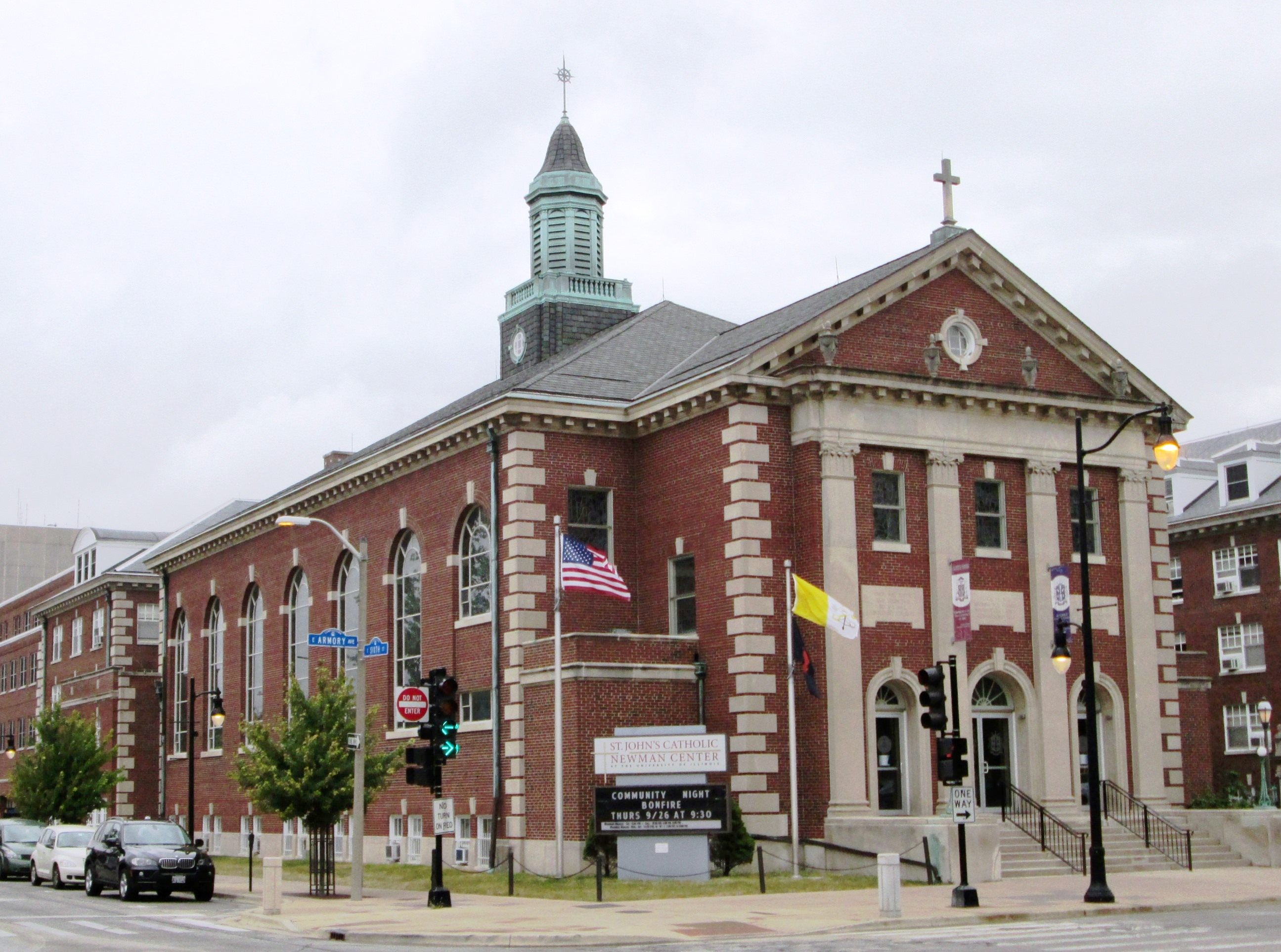
St. John's Catholic Newman Center Champaign, Illinois

St. John's Catholic Newman Center at the University of Illinois at Urbana–Champaign—formerly known as the Newman Foundation—is the largest in the nation and has been considered one of the model Newman Centers in the United States. The center encompasses three main entities: St. John's Catholic Chapel, Newman Hall, and the Institute of Catholic Thought. It is one of the few Newman Centers that also encompasses a large undergraduate residence, Newman Hall, through the university's Certified Private Housing program, having over 600 live-in residents, a cafeteria, and other services.

The Newman Center at Troy University in Troy, Alabama is a coed residence hall which opened in 2013. The Newman Halls will house 376 residents, 6 resident assistants, and one live-in married couple who acts as the community directors.

Blessed Pope John Paul II Newman Center at the University of Illinois, Chicago serves the largest Catholic student population in the Midwest and one of the largest in the country. UIC has 25,000+ students, of which over 15,000 are Catholic. The John Paul II Newman Center in 1999 established the Arthur J. Schmitt Chair in Catholic studies for students to study the Catholic faith and receive college credit for doing so. Currently, students may receive a minor in Catholic studies. Of the other programs which the John Paul II Newman Center offers, Vocation Discernment averages 10-15 students each year who study to become priests and religious brothers and sisters. The Integritas Institute for Ethics, a third program, teaches ethics and morality. The John Paul II Newman Center is in the Catholic Archdiocese of Chicago.

St. Mary's Catholic Center at Texas A&M University decided to turn their permanent parishioners into volunteers for the campus ministry and discontinued all other parish programs not related directly to campus ministry. Two hundred families stayed and the rest went to the other parish in College Station. The Catholic Campus Ministry Association has given presentations before national audiences concerning the success of St. Mary's.

The National Catholic Student Coalition in Delaware was created in 1982 and was the successor of the Newman Center and the National Federation of Catholic College Students.

== Canada ==
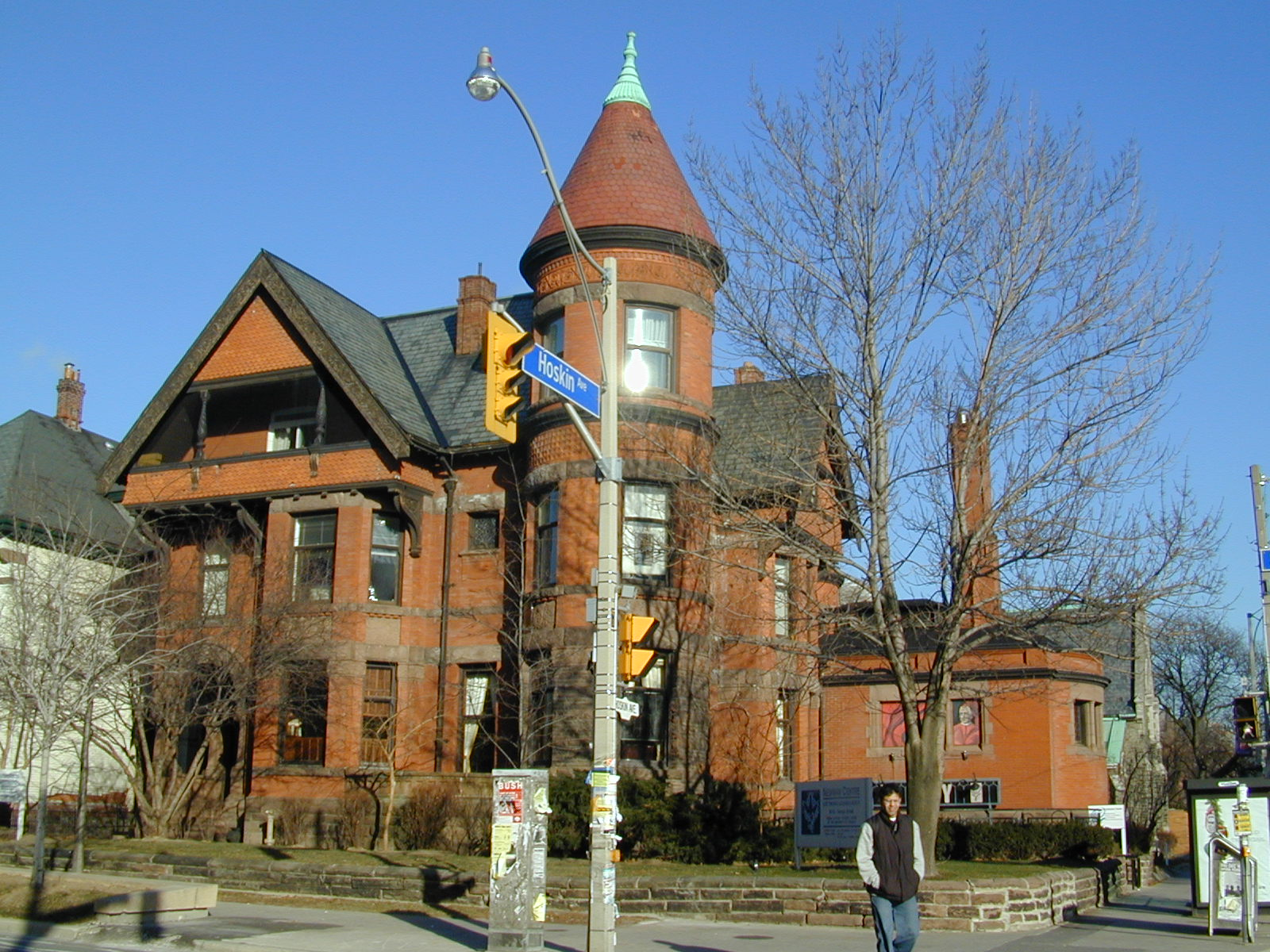
Toronto's Newman Centre, west side

Newman Centre, Toronto is housed in the historical W.D. Matthews House. It is under the direction of the Archdiocese of Toronto and is associated with the neighbouring St. Thomas Aquinas Church.

The Newman Centre in Montreal, which serves McGill University and the Archdiocese of Montreal goes back to the Columbian Club (est. 1897) and the Newman Club (est. 1929). In 1941, the Rev. Gerald Emmett Carter (later Cardinal Archbishop of Toronto) was appointed director. In 1949, under his leadership, the club acquired a new home, "Newman House," located centrally on McGill College Avenue, one block south of the Roddick Gates. In 1951, the Newman Association of Montreal was created (incorporated under the Bighops' Act). The association's purpose would be to support the Catholic community at McGill University. In 1954 the Newman Association purchased the La Fleur mansion located at 3484 Peel Street, which remains the centre's Montreal address to this day. In 1998 the Newman Institute of Catholic Studies was established under the direction of Dr. Daniel Cere. The Newman Institute of Catholic Studies was federally incorporated in 2000, when the Catholic Studies minor concentration was established at McGill University, along with the Kennedy Smith Chair in Catholic Studies.

== Australia ==
University of Queensland and Charles Sturt University are both house Newman Centres.

== New Zealand ==
A Newman Society, along the lines of the one at Oxford University, was first set up at the New Zealand University in 1909.

== See also ==
- Christian study center
