= Chase Hilgenbrinck =

American Roman Catholic Priest and retired soccer player (born 1982)

The Reverend Father Chase Hilgenbrinck

Orders
- Ordination: 24 May 2014
- Rank: Priest

Personal details
- Born: Chase Michael Hilgenbrinck; April 2, 1982 (age 44) Quincy, Illinois, United States
Association football career
- Height: 5 ft 10 in (1.78 m)
- Position: Defender
College career
Years	Team	Apps	(Gls)
2000–2003	Clemson Tigers		
Senior career*
Years	Team	Apps	(Gls)
2004–2005	Huachipato		
2005	→ Deportes Naval (loan)		
2006–2007	Ñublense	61	(11)
2008	New England Revolution	4	(0)
Total		65+	(11+)
- * Club domestic league appearances and goals

The Reverend Father Chase Michael Hilgenbrinck (born April 2, 1982) is an American Roman Catholic priest and former professional soccer defender. In 2008, he notably announced his retirement from professional soccer to become a priest.

== Early life ==
His parents, Mike (a regional sales manager for a fertilizer dealership) and Kim (an accountant with State Farm Insurance), raised their children as Catholics. They brought him and his older brother, Blaise, to church every Sunday, where both sons served as altar boys at Holy Trinity Church in Bloomington, Illinois. Chase played soccer for University High School in Normal, Illinois.

== Soccer career ==
Hilgenbrinck made the United States Under-17 national team, before moving on to play for Clemson University, where he was a three-year starter, playing on the same defensive line as future U.S. senior national team fixture Oguchi Onyewu.

After graduating in 2004, Chase was undrafted by Major League Soccer (MLS) after a decent college career. Claudio Arias, the Chilean soccer coach at nearby Southern Wesleyan University, suggested going to Chile where he thought he could help Chase get a contract. Hilgenbrinck signed with Huachipato of Chile's top division, but was loaned out to lower division club Deportes Naval. He eventually moved on to second-division club Ñublense and helped them to achieve promotion to Chile's top flight. In all, he spent four seasons in Chile, with three clubs, and grew to become a star player.

He joined the Colorado Rapids in early 2008, but was waived during the pre-season without making a senior appearance after the Rapids needed to clear salary cap space for other acquisitions. Two weeks later the New England Revolution called, and after a two-day tryout, the Revolution signed him on March 28.

Hilgenbrinck's last game was on a Sunday, July 13, 2008, at Gillette Stadium in Foxborough, Massachusetts when the New England Revolution faced Mexican club Santos Laguna in a SuperLiga game.

== Catholic priest ==
In the summer of 2007, the vocation director for the Catholic Diocese of Peoria, Illinois, sent him an extensive application packet. He had to write a 20-page autobiography and submit responses to a series of essay questions. In December, the day after he returned to the U.S. following the end of the soccer season in Chile, he went through an entire battery of testing.

Hilgenbrinck retired from soccer on July 14, 2008, to enter Mount St. Mary's Seminary at Mount St. Mary's University in Emmitsburg, Maryland in order to become a priest. He was ordained in the diocese of Peoria on May 24, 2014. He served as a parochial vicar for St. Anne's Catholic Church in East Moline, Illinois, as well as one of the chaplains at Alleman High School in Rock Island, Illinois.

On June 8, 2016, Hilgenbrinck was assigned to St. John's Catholic Newman Center in Champaign, Illinois. In 2020, Hilgenbrinck was appointed vocation director for the Diocese of Peoria.
