= Freedom of Choice Act =

American legislative pro-choice proposal

In the United States, the Freedom of Choice Act was a bill which sought to codify Roe v. Wade into law. The bill asserts in its findings section that Congress has the affirmative power to legislate abortion based, in part, on the crossing of state lines by abortion providers, women seeking abortions, and medical supplies used in abortions.

== Act language ==
The bill was introduced to the Congress in 1989, 1991, 1993, 2004, 2006, and 2007 (H.R. 1964/S. 1173).

The summary of the bill introduced in the House and the Senate reads:

"Freedom of Choice Act - Declares that it is the policy of the United States that every woman has the fundamental right to choose to: (1) bear a child; (2) terminate a pregnancy prior to fetal viability; or (3) terminate it after fetal viability when necessary to protect her life or her health.

Prohibits a governmental entity from : (1) denying or interfering with a woman's right to exercise such choices; or (2) discriminating against the exercise of those rights in its regulation or provision of benefits, facilities, services, or information.

Authorizes an individual aggrieved by a violation of this Act to obtain appropriate relief, including relief against a governmental entity in a civil action.

States that this Act applies to every Federal, State, and local statute, ordinance, regulation, administrative order, decision, policy, practice, or other action enacted, adopted, or implemented before, on, or after the date of enactment of this Act."

== Status and sponsorship ==
The bill was first introduced to the Congress in 1989 and again in 1993. It was reintroduced in 2004 in the 108th Congress, on January 21 in the House of Representatives and on January 22 in the Senate.

The 2004 version was sponsored in the House of Representatives by Jerrold Nadler, and was co-sponsored by James Greenwood, Louise Slaughter, and Diana Degette. In the Senate, it was sponsored by Barbara Boxer, and originally co-sponsored by Senators Jon Corzine, Patty Murray, Frank Lautenberg, Hillary Clinton, Maria Cantwell, Jim Jeffords, Joseph Lieberman, Dianne Feinstein, Paul Sarbanes, and Barbara Mikulski.

The bills were referred to the Judiciary Committees of the respective Houses. Neither bill received further action in the 108th Congress. The bills were reintroduced on April 19, 2007 in the 110th Congress (H.R. 1964/S. 1173), but, like their predecessors, were referred to committee without further action.

During his tenure in the United States Senate, Barack Obama co-sponsored the 2007 Senate version of the Freedom of Choice Act (S. 1173). Responding to a question regarding how he would preserve reproductive rights in a speech given to the Planned Parenthood Action Fund on July 17, 2007, Obama declared, "The first thing I'd do, as president, is sign the Freedom of Choice Act. That's the first thing that I'd do."

In a press conference on April 29, 2009, President Obama said that although he supports a woman's right to choose to have an abortion, passage of the Freedom of Choice Act was not his "highest legislative priority". Although Democrats controlled both the House and Senate during the 111th Congress, protecting abortion rights was not prioritized since six of the nine sitting Supreme Court Justices supported upholding Roe v. Wade. Instead, Democrats focused on passing the Affordable Care Act. It would not be until the 113th Congress in 2013 that another abortion rights bill would be introduced, the Women's Health Protection Act.

== Description and criticism ==
The bill is described by NARAL Pro-Choice America president Nancy Keenan as a bill to "codify Roe v. Wade" which would "repeal the Bush-backed Federal Abortion Ban", referring to the Partial-Birth Abortion Ban Act, and "other federal restrictions". Opponents of FOCA assert that it would, if passed, invalidate every restriction on abortion nationwide, including parental notification laws, informed consent laws, and bans on partial birth abortion. However, the bill would still prohibit partial birth abortions due to the wording of the bill and the stated definition of viability, the stage of pregnancy when there is a reasonable likelihood of the sustained survival of the fetus outside of the woman.

Two days after Barack Obama's inauguration, a protester in the March for Life holds a "No FOCA" sign.

The U.S. Conference of Catholic Bishops (USCCB) has been strongly opposed to the Freedom of Choice Act. According to the USCCB's Secretariat for Pro-Life Activities, FOCA would not only "codify the Supreme Court's 1973 decision in Roe v. Wade" but "in allowing and promoting abortion, FOCA goes far beyond even Roe".

Opponents of FOCA assert that the bill would force taxpayers to subsidize abortion and would jeopardize existing laws prohibiting abortions in public hospitals and barring non-physicians from performing abortions. Others estimate that the passage of FOCA would result in approximately 125,000 more abortions being performed annually in the United States. Some opponents argue that FOCA would effectively repeal the Hyde Amendment, a federal law which bars the use of federal funding for abortions in some cases. Legal scholar Douglas Kmiec, a pro-life Republican, disagrees with the latter assertion, noting that the Hyde Amendment is renewed annually by Congress; Kmiec argues that this legislation would not supersede it.

Those who oppose the Act interpret it as an attempt to obligate religious hospitals to either "do abortions or close", while FOCA supporters argue that existing conscience clause laws would protect religious hospitals. In early 2009, Catholic News Service asserted that in its interpretation of the legislation, FOCA neither poses any such risk to Catholic hospitals, nor would require religious hospitals to participate in abortion. Opponents, however, assert that conscience clauses are weak and easily reinterpreted, and do not explicitly allow religious hospitals to ban the abortion procedure within the hospital.

The election of Barack Obama, an advocate of the Freedom of Choice Act, to the presidency caused pro-life organizations to organize against the bill in early 2009. Notable campaigns that were organized include Americans United for Life's petition to Congress called Fight FOCA and the "What the FOCA?!" campaign created by Students for Life of Illinois. Although he promised Planned Parenthood in 2007 that “the first thing I’d do as president” would be to sign it, by May 2009 he said the bill is “not my highest legislative priority”.

== Legislative history ==
Congress	Short title	Bill number(s)	Date introduced	Sponsor(s)	# of cosponsors	Latest status
101st Congress	Freedom of Choice Act of 1989	H.R. 3700	November 17, 1989	Don Edwards (D-CA)	127	Died in committee
101st Congress	Freedom of Choice Act of 1989	S. 1912	November 17, 1989	Alan Cranston (D-CA)	26	Died in committee
102nd Congress	Freedom of Choice Act of 1991	H.R. 25	January 3, 1991	Don Edwards (D-CA)	143	Died in committee
102nd Congress	Freedom of Choice Act of 1991	S. 25	January 14, 1991	Alan Cranston (D-CA)	47	Died in committee
103rd Congress	Freedom of Choice Act of 1993	H.R. 25	January 5, 1993	Don Edwards (D-CA)	142	Died in committee
103rd Congress	Freedom of Choice Act of 1993	S. 25	January 21, 1993	George J. Mitchell (D-ME)	41	Died in committee
103rd Congress	Freedom of Choice Act of 1993	H.R. 1068	February 23, 1993	Peter Torkildsen (R-MA)	0	Died in committee
108th Congress	Freedom of Choice Act	H.R. 3719	January 21, 2004	Jerry Nadler (D-NY)	87	Died in committee
108th Congress	Freedom of Choice Act	S. 2020	January 22, 2004	Barbara Boxer (D-CA)	17	Died in committee
109th Congress	Freedom of Choice Act	H.R. 5151	April 6, 2006	Jerry Nadler (D-NY)	67	Died in committee
109th Congress	Freedom of Choice Act	S. 2593	April 6, 2006	Barbara Boxer (D-CA)	11	Died in committee
110th Congress	Freedom of Choice Act	H.R. 1964	April 19, 2007	Jerry Nadler (D-NY)	109	Died in committee
110th Congress	Freedom of Choice Act	S. 1173	April 19, 2007	Barbara Boxer (D-CA)	19	Died in committee
