= St. John's Catholic Newman Center =

Catholic ministry at the University of Illinois at Urbana-Champaign

Coordinates: 40°06′22.0″N 88°13′47.6″W

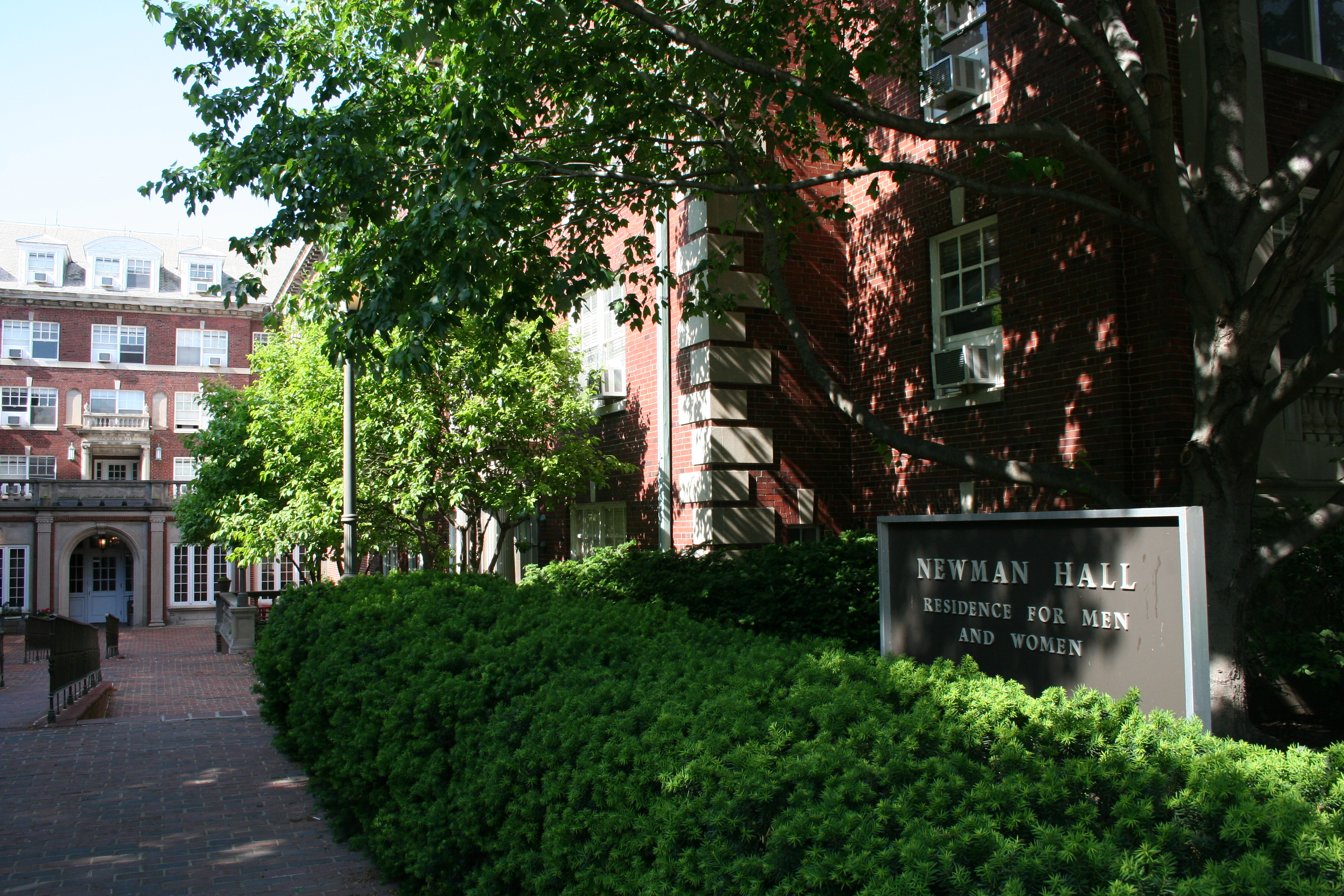
Entrance to Newman Hall at St. John's Catholic Newman Center

St. John's Catholic Newman Center is the largest Newman Center in the United States. It is located on the campus of the University of Illinois at Urbana–Champaign. Consisting of St. John's Catholic Chapel, Newman Hall, and a variety of student-focused ministry programs, the center resides within the Roman Catholic Diocese of Peoria.

== History ==
In the early 1900s, the majority of Catholic university students attended private Catholic institutions instead of public schools such as the University of Illinois at Urbana–Champaign. However, as time progressed, a growing number of Catholic university students began attending secular universities.

To spiritually support these students, small chapels were opened near the campuses of the secular universities. Initially, this was also the goal of St. John's Catholic Chapel.

As plans were made for the construction of St. John's, the Knights of Columbus and other responsible parties decided to expand their vision. Instead of merely building a church building, they also constructed a dormitory structure for Catholic students. This dormitory is directly connected to St. John's Catholic Chapel via an underground passage.

The idea of providing student housing directly connected to a Catholic Newman Center was quite new and innovative. Many sources consider St. John's Catholic Newman Center to be a model example of integrating Catholic student life with campus life.

=== Timeline of events ===
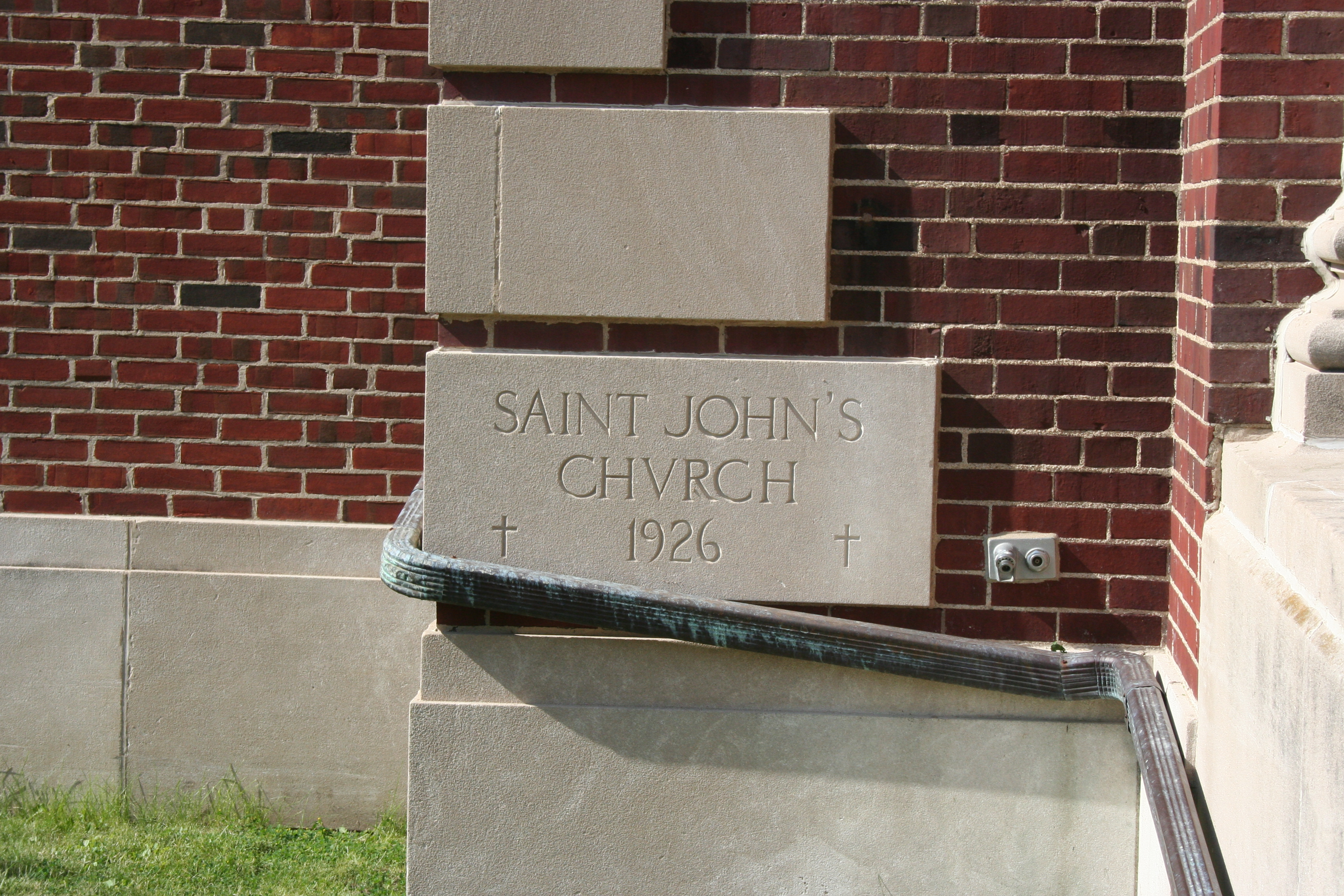
Cornerstone of St. John's Catholic Chapel

First, in 1905 students organize the Spalding Guild for Catholic students. This organization was quite similar to a Newman Club which was a group of young students who met and shared their faith. Then, in 1908, the Guild acquires Loyola House, its first headquarters, on Main Street in Urbana. Loyola House in 1912 becomes a chapter of Phi Kappa Theta, a national Catholic fraternity. By 1915, the Knights of Columbus agree to support a chaplain for students.

As a result of that request, Father John O'Brien was appointed chaplain in August 1917. In January 1920, the Foundation is formally incorporated as the Columbus Foundation. Classes are offered by the Foundation starting in February 1920. Plans are created for construction of St. John's Catholic Chapel in May 1922.

In 1924, the Knights of Columbus purchased land at Sixth and Armory Street for $200,000. The current St. John's Catholic Newman Center remains located there today.

Finally, in 1926, the Columbus Foundation was renamed the Newman Foundation. By August 1926, the Cornerstone for the chapel was laid.

After one year, the chapel was completed and on September 28, 1927, the first mass was held in the chapel. Two years later in 1929, the entire Newman Foundation building was completed.

An extensive $40 million expansion of Newman Hall was completed with the dedication ceremony on September 7, 2008. The renovation increased the size of Newman Center to 200,000 square feet (19,000 m^{2}). About 600 students now live in Newman Hall, and the center itself serves a campus Catholic population of more than 10,000. The renovation also brought air conditioning to St. John's Catholic Chapel.

An additional renovation was made to St. John's Catholic Chapel in 2023. The renovation budget was approximately $2.5 million, and was carried out by Daprato Rigali Studios. The renovation entailed a banner painting around the entire chapel, which quotes the first chapter of the Gospel of John, as St. John the Evangelist is the patron of the Chapel. Additional renovations included repainting the faux-marble columns in the Chapel, as well as painting the wall behind the altar and baldachin with the heraldic eagle of St. John the Evangelist interspersed with the cardinalic coat of arms of St. John Henry Newman, the patron saint of Newman centers across the United States. The four symbols of the Gospel writers were painted on the ceiling of the chapel as well. The lighting and sound systems were updated, the pews and kneelers were restored, and a marble statue of St. John Henry Newman was added to the side-shrine to the right of the altar. Finally, two confessionals were constructed in the chapel narthex.

A mass of blessing for the renovation of the chapel was held on October 8, 2023. The chief celebrant of the mass was Bishop Louis Tylka, Bishop of the Diocese of Peoria.

=== Leadership ===
- Fr. Lee Brokaw, 2024-Present
- Fr. Robert Lampitt, 2017–2024
- Fr. Luke Spannagel, 2014–2017
- Msgr. Gregory Ketcham, 2006–2014
- Msgr. Stewart Swetland, 1997–2006
- Msgr. Edward Duncan, 1943–1997
- Fr. Roger Schoenbechler, OSB, 1939–1943
- Fr. John O'Brien, 1917–1939

== Organization of SJCNC ==
A reorganization took place in 2005 which organized St. John's Catholic Newman Center into three different groups. All three divisions are located together at 604 East Armory Avenue in Champaign. However, each group has a specific focus towards fulfilling the Newman Foundation's mission.

=== St. John's Catholic Chapel ===
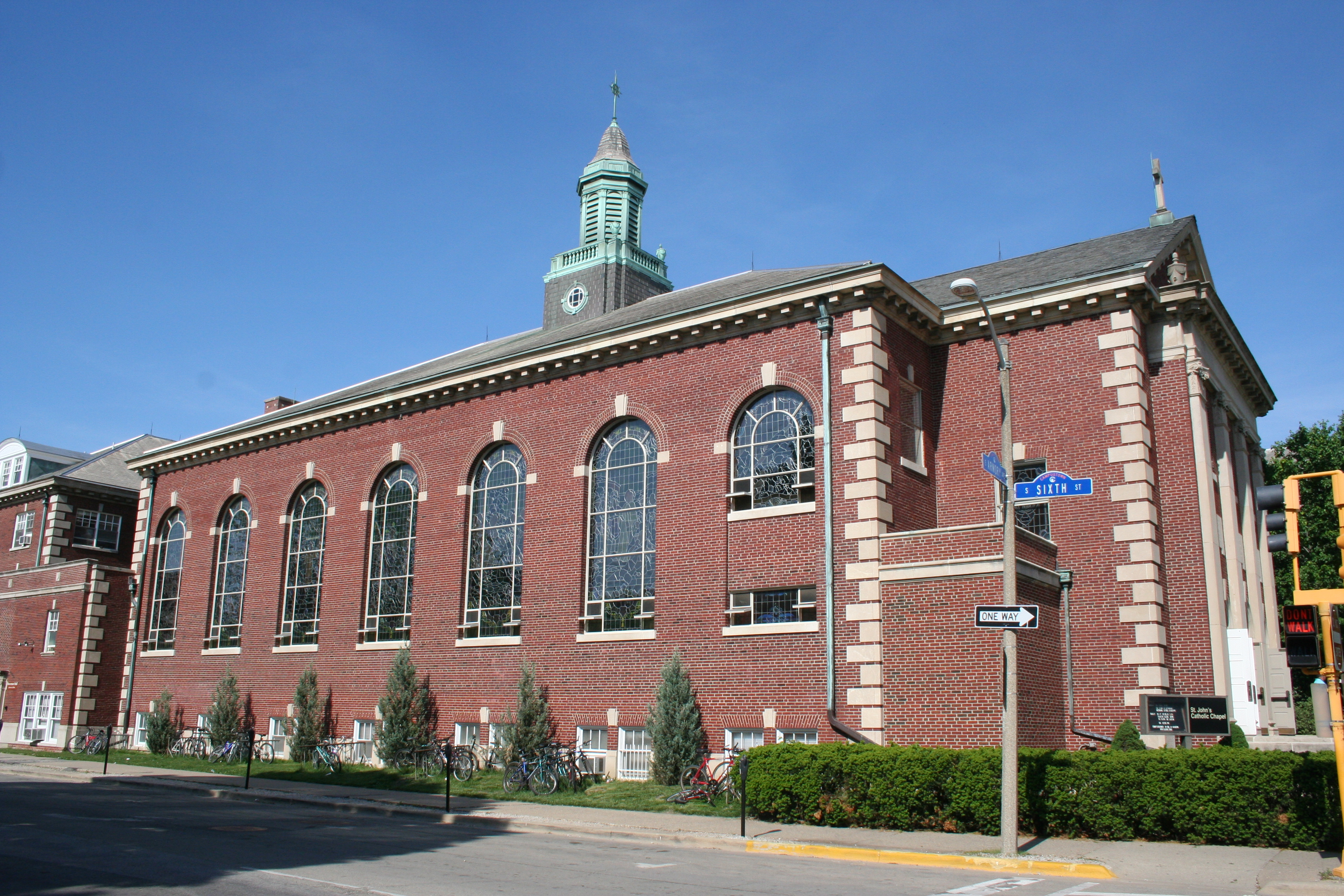
A picture of St. John's Catholic Chapel at 6th and Armory

Located a block from the Quad, St. John's Catholic Chapel is open every day for private prayer and celebrates mass at least two times a day. The primary focus for the Chapel is to provide for the spiritual needs of college students at the University of Illinois at Urbana–Champaign and Parkland College. Several priests are on staff at St. John's Catholic Chapel to provide spiritual direction and other services for interested students.

=== Newman Hall ===
A coed residence hall is directly adjacent (and connected to) St. John's Catholic Chapel. Recently completed construction increased the hall's capacity from about 300 residents to nearly 600. Newman Hall is a member of the University of Illinois's Private Certified Housing system which allows freshman and incoming students to live at Newman Hall without having to live in a University dorm.

=== Newman House (historical) ===
For many years, St. John's Catholic Newman Center also had an all-female house located about a block away from the main Newman Hall. Newman House was originally a sorority that was purchased by the Newman Foundation. The University of Illinois at Urbana-Champaign purchased Newman House from the St. John's Catholic Newman Center in 2008 to make room for a new parking lot. The existing structure of Newman House needed renovation, and the sale of the property was deemed to be in the best interests of the Newman Center. The Newman House was demolished after the purchase.

== Student groups and organizations ==
There are a number of groups and organizations which make up St. John's Catholic Newman Center. These organizations include the Knights of Columbus, Fellowship of Catholic University Students, Koinonia Retreats, and RCIA among others.

=== Knights of Columbus ===
There is a Knights of Columbus College Council located at St. John's. The Illini Council 2782 was founded in 1937 as the first college council at a public university. It serves as a fraternal group for Catholic men on campus to be a part of in order to serve their community and their Church. The Illini Council won four consecutive national-level awards given out by the Knights of Columbus from 2008–2012 for their programs and efforts at UIUC and in the surrounding area. In 2015, Illini Council was recognized by the Knights of Columbus as the Outstanding College Council of the Year.

=== FOCUS ===
There are a total of 7 FOCUS missionaries on campus who lead Bible Studies and meet with students on a one-on-one basis. These Bible studies work to help bring students deeper into their spiritual life by reflecting on scripture passages and by building authentic Christian communities. The one-on-one meetings with students are called "discipleship" and are aimed at teaching the students more about their Catholic faith and how to live out that faith through leading their peers at school and in the work force. Occasional large group meetings allow FOCUS members to meet each other and grow in community. The weekly bible study groups are much smaller and gender-specific. The large group events are open to all students.

=== Illini Collegians for Life ===
ICFL is a registered student organization that serves as the central body of the pro-life movement on campus. The University of Illinois was the location of the foundation of Students for Life of Illinois (a statewide coalition of collegiate anti-abortion organizations) in 2006 which now has its home office within the Newman Center. ICFL meets weekly to prepare fundraisers and awareness projects, and its main endeavor involves sending students to the March For Life in January each year.

=== Koinonia ===
"Koinonia" is the Greek word for "community," a concept that was very evident in the faith of the early Church. The term "koinonia" reflects the Church's history, fellowship, and support for its members. It is often used in the New Testament to refer to the early Christian churches, which met in generally small and intimate settings. A weekend Koinonia retreat is a reminder of those early days, but also an opportunity to live in community with others.

The Koinonia retreat weekend is an experience in Christian community based on the Paschal mystery of the Lord Jesus, His Life, Death and Resurrection. During a retreat, participants have the chance to hear about the faith of student leaders and share some of their experiences with other participants.

The Retreat consists of talks, discussions, reflections, prayer and celebrations of the Sacraments of Penance and Eucharist. Though the Retreat is offered from a Catholic perspective, non-Catholics are welcome to attend.

== See also ==
- Students for Life of Illinois
