= National Catholic Student Coalition =

The regions of the NCSC

The National Catholic Student Coalition (NCSC) was an association of Catholic campus ministry groups and individual Catholic students at colleges or universities throughout the United States. It often held an annual student leadership conference between December 28 and January 1.

== History ==
The coalition was created in 1982 by 40 college and university students from around the United States. It was the successor of the National Newman Club Federation (1908–1968) and the National Federation of Catholic College Students (1938–1968).

The coalition's newsletter was called "The Catholic Collegian".

NCSC ceased operating around 2014. Its mission has been extended to the Seek conference, which is principally for students who attend Catholic colleges, rather than secular institutions such as state universities.

== Partners ==
The National Catholic Student Coalition was a partner with regional, national, and international associations whose missions were aligned with its own. Its partners included:

- Catholic Campus Ministry Association (CCMA)
- National Association of Diocesan Directors of Campus Ministry (NADDCM)
- United States Conference of Catholic Bishops (USCCB)
- International Movement of Catholic Students (IMCS) - Pax Romana
- International Young Catholic Students (IYCS)
- Catholic Movement for Intellectual and Cultural Affairs (CMICA) - Pax Romana

== Regions ==
The NCSC was divided into four regions. The West, Midwest, South, and Northeast. Each region had its own leadership team, headed by a regional chairperson.
