= Students for Life of Illinois =

Non-profit organization in Illinois, U.S.

Students for Life of Illinois (or SFLI or Students for Life) is a 501c3 non-profit organization that was founded in 2006. The organization's purpose is to train collegiate anti-abortion leaders in the state of Illinois. It is not affiliated with the national organization Students for Life of America.

According to a Chicago Tribune 2009 report, young anti-abortion activists in Illinois "say they're trying to steer away from being portrayed as abrasive, confrontational and badgering" and rather focus on providing information and hold prayer services. Michael Laughlin, 20, president of Loyola University Chicago's Students for Life, commented "'You do get the ones real upset and [who say] 'You don't know my story, where I came from, what's going on in my life, and who are you to tell me all this stuff.' I tell them: 'I don't know your story or situation, but I'm here and I want to help you,'"; the Tribune article suggests that abortion debate will continue.

== Mission statement ==
"Our Mission is to ensure a pro-life future by providing high quality personal mentoring of pro-life student leaders on a maximum number of Illinois campuses that results in the exponential creation of compassionate, capable and passionate pro-life leaders and a contagiously pro-life campus environment."

== Activities ==
The organization generated net revenues (revenues less fund-raising expenses) of $154k, $151k, $101k in 2012, 2011, and 2010.

Students for Life of Illinois has engaged in various activities for Illinois students:

- State-Wide Conference (summit): Since 2007 - Nationally known speakers are brought in to train student activists.
- March for Life (Washington, D.C.)March for Life Trip (Washington, DC): Since 2006 - Bus trips are organized for students from around the state.
- March for Life Chicago: Since 2012 - SFLI serves on the planning committee and provides speakers.
- Student Lobby Days - Students for Life of Illinois organizes lobby days for students from around Illinois to participate in the legislative process in Springfield, IL at the Illinois Capitol.

== Speaking ==
SFLI staff, interns and students provide speaking services in Illinois and nationally. Topics focus on abortion and anti-abortion student involvement.

SFLI speakers focus on speaking for student organizations to train student leaders. However, their audiences and venues have also included:

- The National Students for Life of America Conference
- Knights of Columbus
- Local Right to Life groups
- The March for Life Chicago
- 40 Days for Life
- Fundraisers
- Academic Conferences
- 40 Film Documentary - SFLI staff and students interviewed regarding youth anti-abortion movement

== Coalitions ==
Students for Life of Illinois has started or participated in several state and national coalitions.

- Defund Planned Parenthood - Coalition to stop government funding of Planned Parenthood including a youth contest.
- Let Parents Know - Coalition to get Illinois to enforce their parental notification law. Started by SFLI.
- SpeakOut Illinois - Coalition of anti-abortion organization in Illinois.
- Arrested for Praying - Coalition to protect an anti-abortion protester from unlawful arrest.
- Stop Illinois Foca - Coalition to stop abortion legislation in Illinois.
- Stand with Carleton - Coalition to support free speech rights of Canadian anti-abortion students.
- Stop the Abortion Mandate - Coalition to block portions of the Affordable Care Act that would mandate funding of abortion.

== Other notable projects ==
Students for Life of Illinois has launched these other community initiatives.

- What the FOCA?! - Students for Life of Illinois created the What The FOCA?! campaign, website and T-shirts gained national attention in 2009. It was a response to President Obama's campaign promise to implement the Freedom of Choice Act.
- 40 Days for Life Champaign - Students for Life of Illinois started and led the local 40 Days for Life campaign in Champaign, Illinois in 2009. This anti-abortion community outreach occurs each spring and fall for 40 Days.
- Biking for Babies - Students for Life of Illinois created the anti-abortion fundraising event Biking for Babies in 2009. Biking for Babies split off and became a separate non-profit organization in 2012.

== Awards ==
Students for Life of Illinois's founder, John-Paul Deddens, received the 'Witness for Life Award' from Illinois Citizens for Life in 2013.
