= St. John Henry Newman Catholic Church (Toronto) =

- Newman Chapel
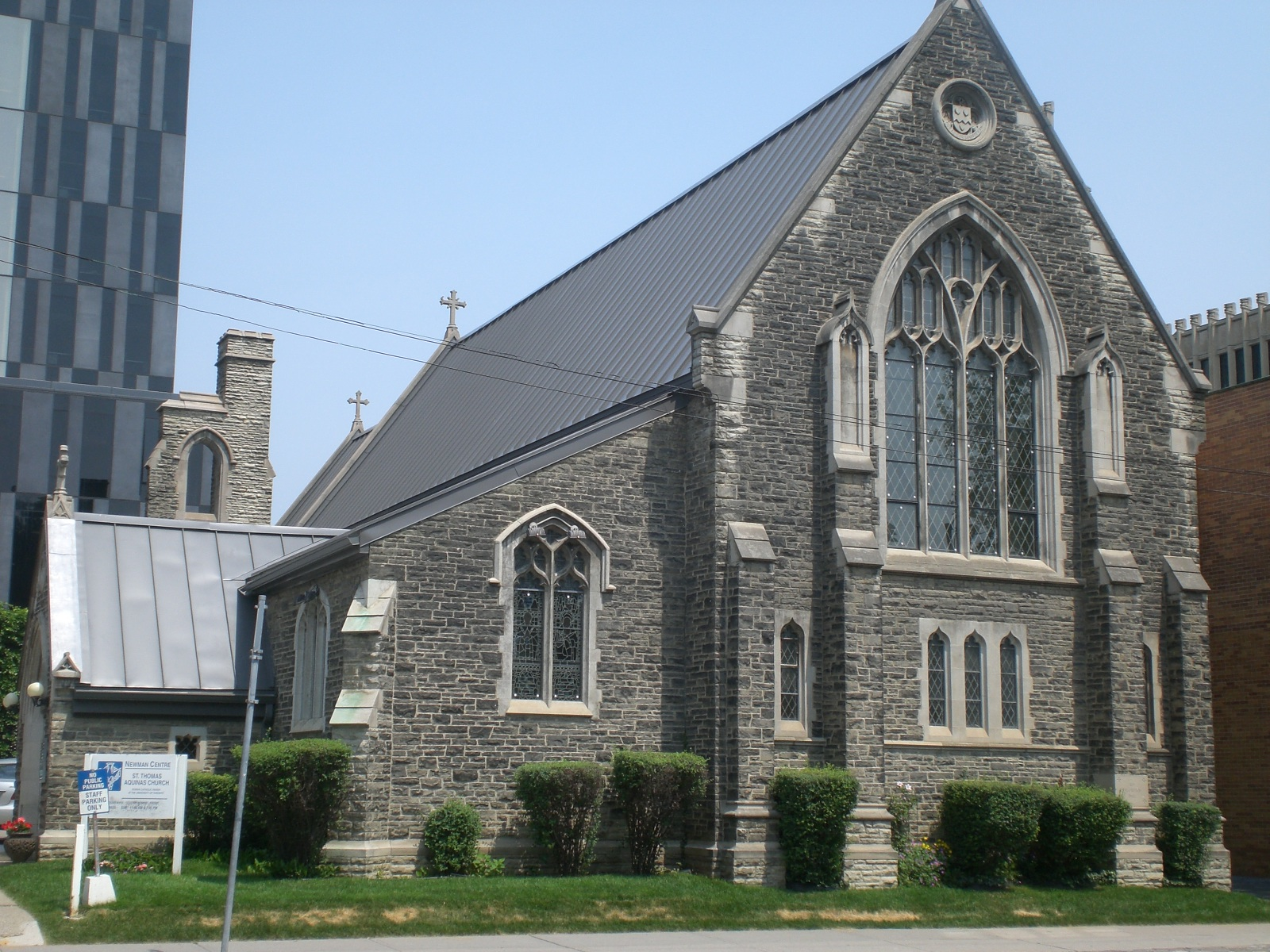
- Church on Hoskin Avenue
- St. John Henry Newman Catholic Church
- 43.664411°N 79.397876°W
- Location: 89 St. George Street; Toronto, Ontario; M5S 2E8
- Country: Canada
- Denomination: Roman Catholic
- Website: NewmanToronto.com

History
- Former name: St. Thomas Aquinas Catholic Church
- Status: Active
- Founder: Newman Centre
- Dedication: St. John Henry Newman
- Dedicated: March 27, 1927

Architecture
- Functional status: Parish church
- Heritage designation: Listed historical building
- Designated: 1973
- Architect: Arthur W. Holmes
- Style: Gothic Revival
- Groundbreaking: 1926
- Completed: 1927

Administration
- Archdiocese: Toronto
- Deanery: Downtown

St. John Henry Newman Catholic Church, or Newman Chapel (formerly St. Thomas Aquinas Church), is a Roman Catholic church within the St. George campus of the University of Toronto in Toronto, Ontario, Canada. It was built in 1926–1927 as a chapel for the Newman Centre next door. In 1995, it became a quasi-parish church. It is situated on the corner of Hoskin Avenue and St. George Street in Toronto, next to Massey College.

== History ==
=== Origin ===
Before the site was a church, it was a coach house attached to the home of Wilmot Deloui Matthews. He was a businessman, owner of W. D. Matthews and one-time president of the Toronto Board of Trade. He built the house from 1890 to 1891. He died in 1919 and the whole site was purchased by the Newman Club in 1922. At first, before the church was built, Mass was held in the Oak Room of the house next door.

As the size of the congregation increased, it was realised that a larger space for Mass was required. Plans were drawn up to replace the coach house with a chapel. To make the most of the available space, the chapel was designed to be rectangular and perpendicular to the street, with its chancel facing North.

=== Architecture ===
The Gothic Revival style structure was built from 1926 to 1927 by architect Arthur William Holmes. The building was specifically build in the English Perpendicular Gothic style, bearing remarkable similarities to the Holy Rosary Church in Toronto, which was being built at the same time, also by Holmes. The chapel, unusually for churches, is asymmetrical, having two aisles instead of the more typical three aisle basilica layout. The front facade of the chapel features a stone quatrefoil with the arms of John Henry Newman. Another unique feature of the chapel was its high altar, which had riddel curtains and posts topped by two wooden angels; such altars are commonly called "English altars". As such, the building's architecture and furnishing reflects the more medievalist tastes of the Liturgical Movement at that time.

After the building's completion, it was blessed by the Archbishop of Toronto, Neil McNeil. On 27 March 1927, he dedicated the chapel to St. Thomas Aquinas.

The chapel, prior to 1999, only had four stained glass windows: two smaller windows in the chancel respectively depicting various images of the Blessed Virgin Mary and St. Joseph; one window on the East(liturgical south) wall of the nave with scenes from the life of St. Paul the Apostle, and the window at the liturgical West end of the liturgical North aisle, featuring images of St. Thomas Aquinas, then patron of the chapel, and John Henry Newman, the current patron. All of these windows were done in the Early English Gothic style, with the dark blue background prominent throughout.

Despite the building being usable, it remains unfinished to this day, with more than half of its windows still without stained glass(including the two largest windows at the two ends of the chapel), and all of its corbels uncarved. In addition, the bellcote on the Northwest(liturgical Northeast) side of the exterior remains devoid of bells.

Because of its connection to the Newman Centre, it was known by students on campus as the Newman Chapel. From 1913 to 1936, the Newman Centre and chapel were served by the Paulist Fathers at St. Peter's Church, Toronto.

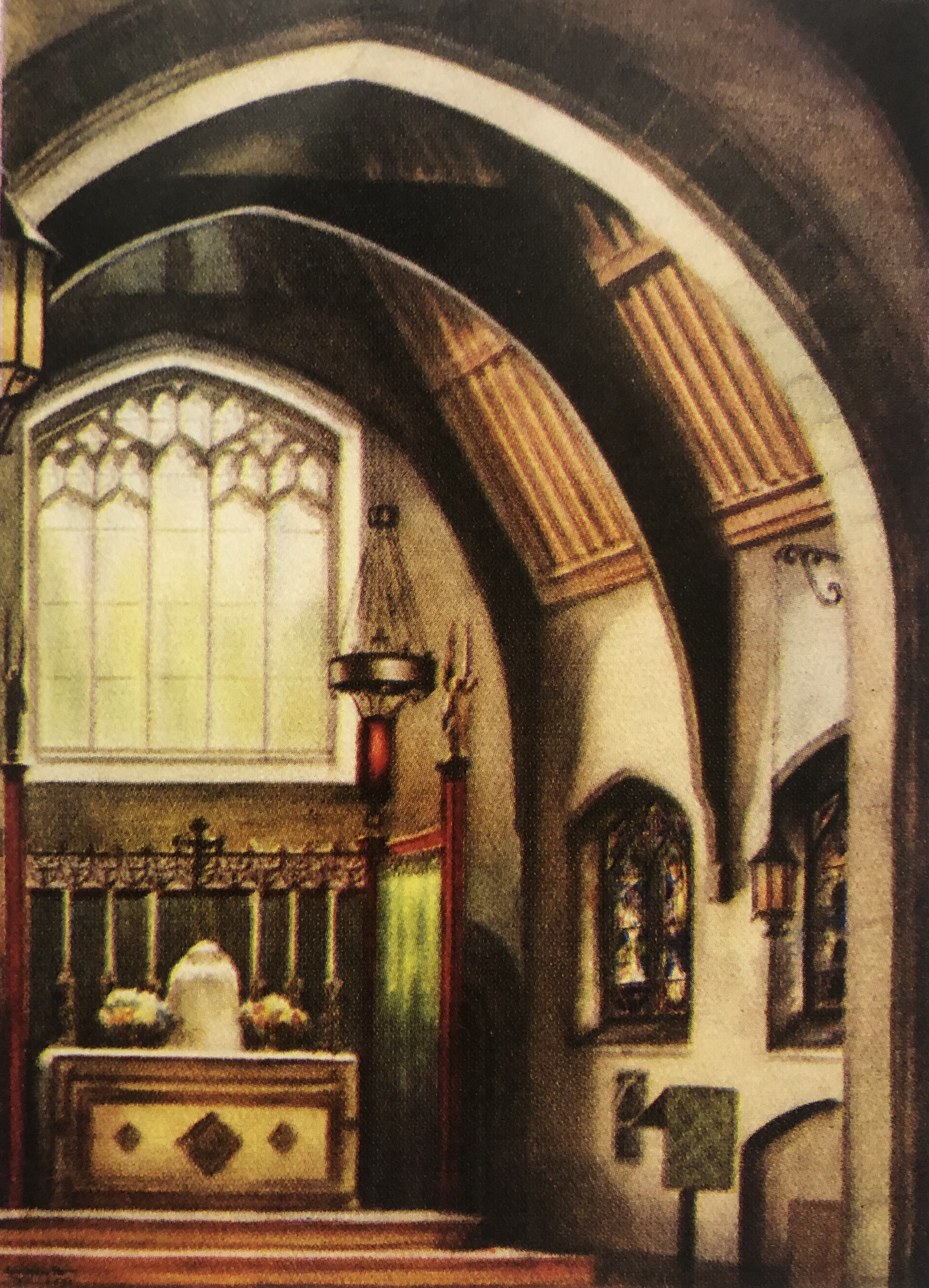
A watercolour painting of the sanctuary and the high altar, before the reordering of the 1960s

=== Renovations and Reorderings ===
Over time, renovations were made to the church. In the 1960s and 70s, it was radically altered after the Second Vatican Council to conform to a mistaken interpretation of the liturgical reform, with the Lady Chapel altar, the high altar reredos, riddel curtains and posts removed, although the angels that topped the riddel posts were later recovered. The high altar itself and the tabernacle was moved to the Lady Chapel, while a plain, freestanding altar was constructed on the East side of the nave, with the pews arranged in a "U" shape around the new sanctuary, while the old sanctuary became congregational seating.

In 1973, it was added to the Toronto Historical Board's inventory of historical buildings by the Ontario Heritage Trust.

In 1995, the Archdiocese of Toronto designated the chapel a quasi-parish church.

From 1999 to 2000, a renovation was undertaken to install windows depicting prominent 20th-century Christians. Around the same time, the church was reordered: the altar was moved to the entrance of the old chancel; the choir seating was moved to behind the altar, under the (liturgical)East window; the original stations of the cross, which had since the 60s been put in storage, was put back on the walls of the nave; the congregation seating was arranged in an antiphonal style, facing each other across the center aisle in the nave, in the midst of which were placed an ambo and a large immersion baptismal font.

In 2014, the roof was renovated. It was the first time it had been replaced in 88 years.

At some point after Vatican II, a large cross with an image of the Risen Christ, done in a Modernist style, was hung under the chancel arch.

In 2018, another reordering and renovation of the chapel took place, which restored much of the original interior arrangement of the chapel. The more recent free standing altar was removed, and the old high altar, reinstated in the chancel, was modified to allow for versus populum celebrations, while the choir seating was moved to the (liturgical)West end of the nave. The tabernacle, with a new altar of repose, constructed in the same style as the high altar, was centrally placed under the (liturgical)East window atop three step, reminiscent of the original arrangement of the altar prior to the reordering of the 60s. The Lady Chapel flooring and some of the sanctuary steps were replaced with grey and black stone tiles, with the words "Tantum ergo sacramentum" inscribed on the sanctuary steps leading up to the chancel. It was around this time that the wooden angels that originally topped the riddel posts were given back by an individual to whom it was given away in the 60s; these angels now flank the tabernacle. A new statue of St. Joseph was installed on the East(liturgically South) wall of the nave, and the pews in the nave was restored to their original arrangement before the wreckovation of the 1960s.

John Henry Newman, the namesake of the Newman Centre, was canonized October 13, 2019. Soon after this, the chapel, formerly dedicated to St. Thomas Aquinas, was rededicated to St. John Henry Newman.

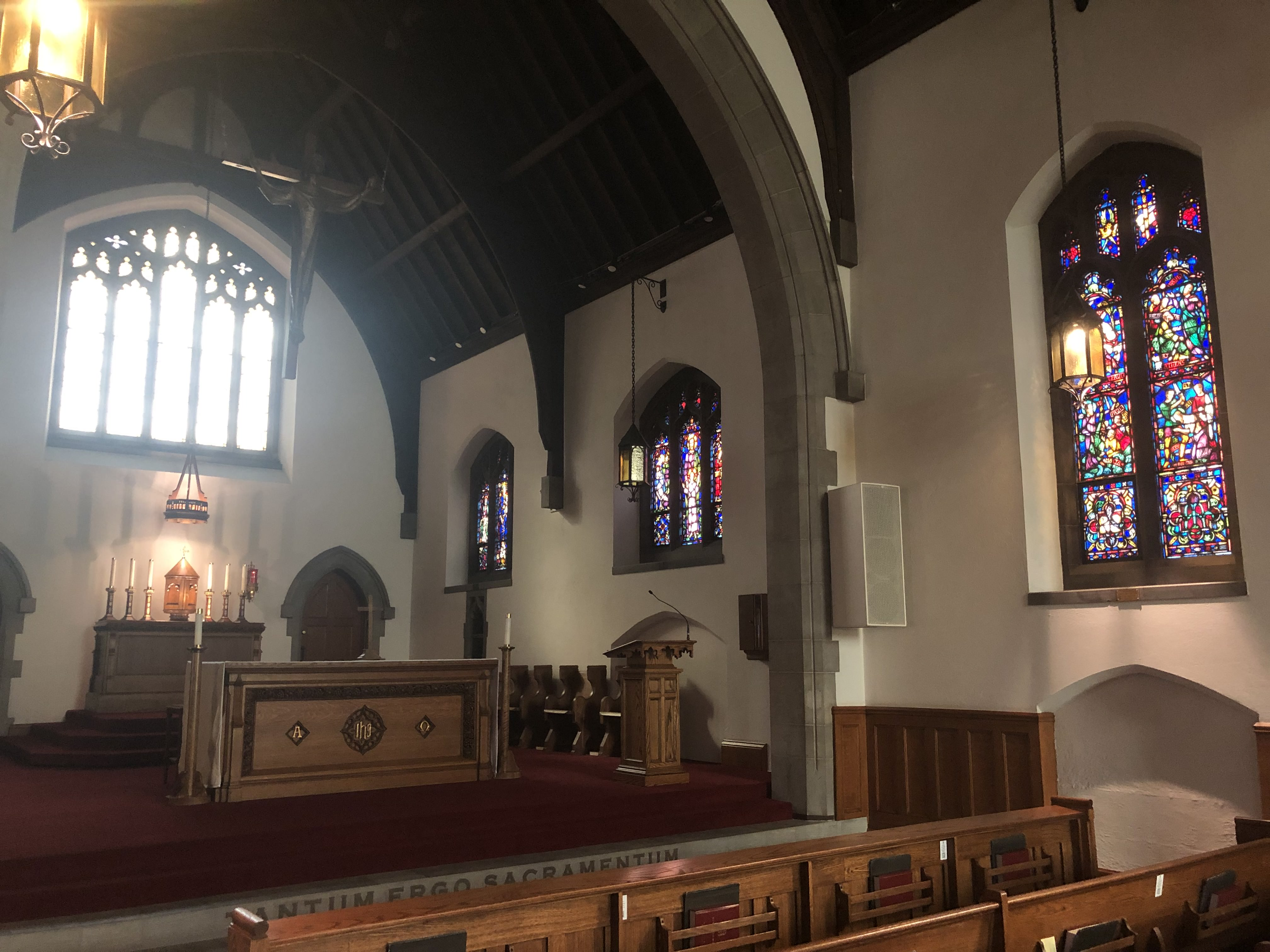
The sanctuary and chancel of the Newman Chapel today.

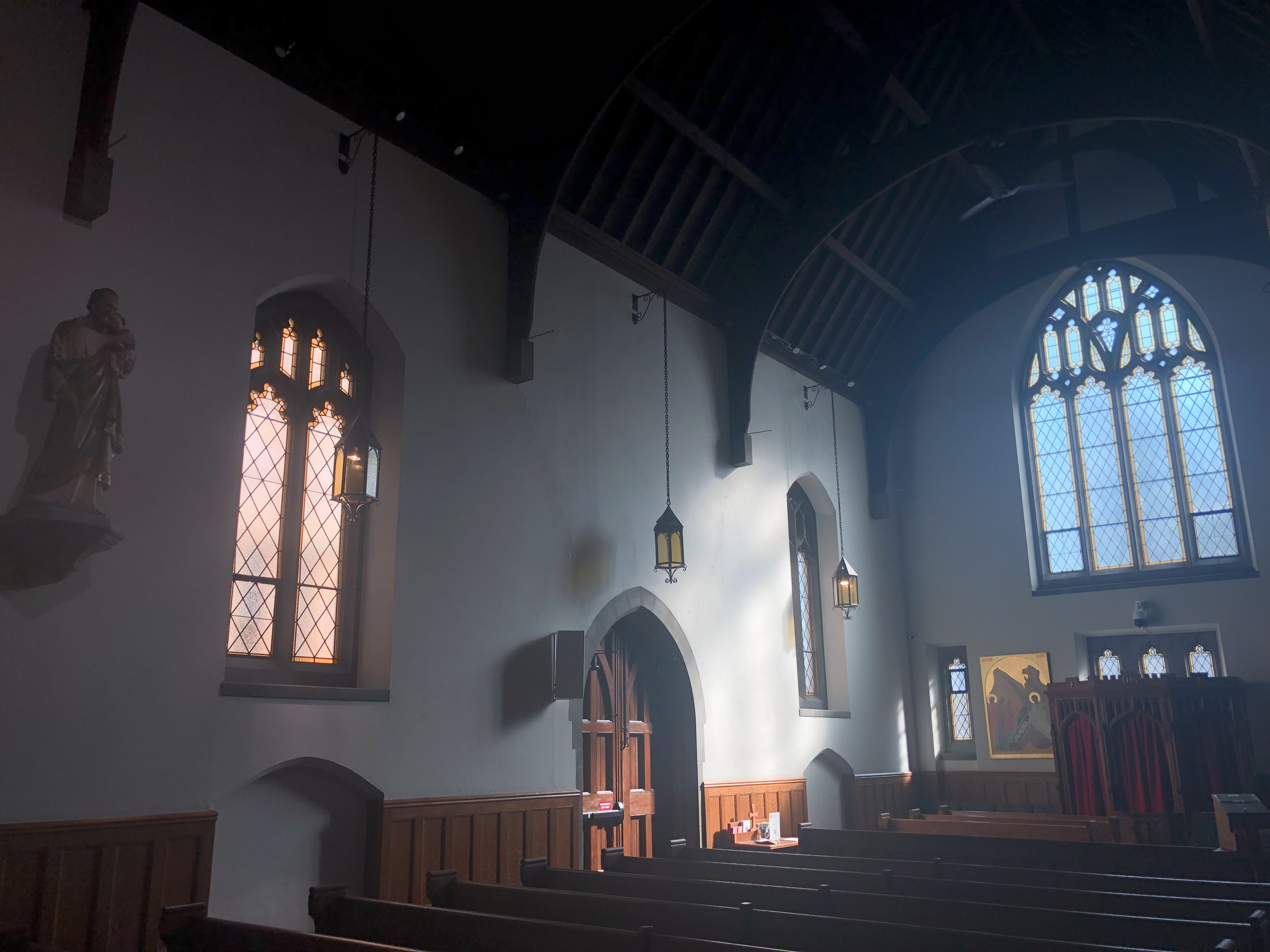
Nave, looking towards the liturgical West.

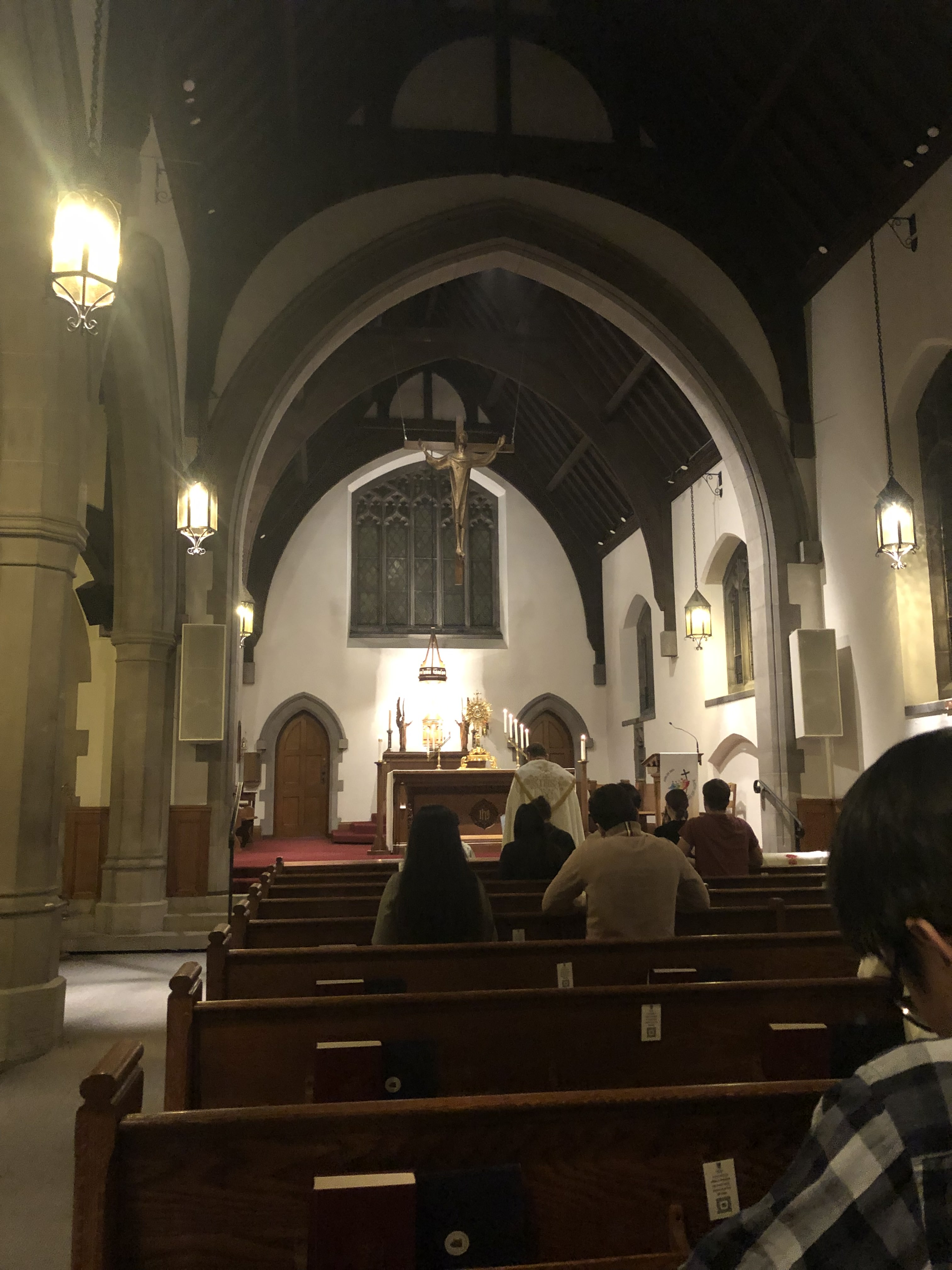
Exposition and benediction of the Blessed Sacrament. Note the original riddel angels next to the tabernacle

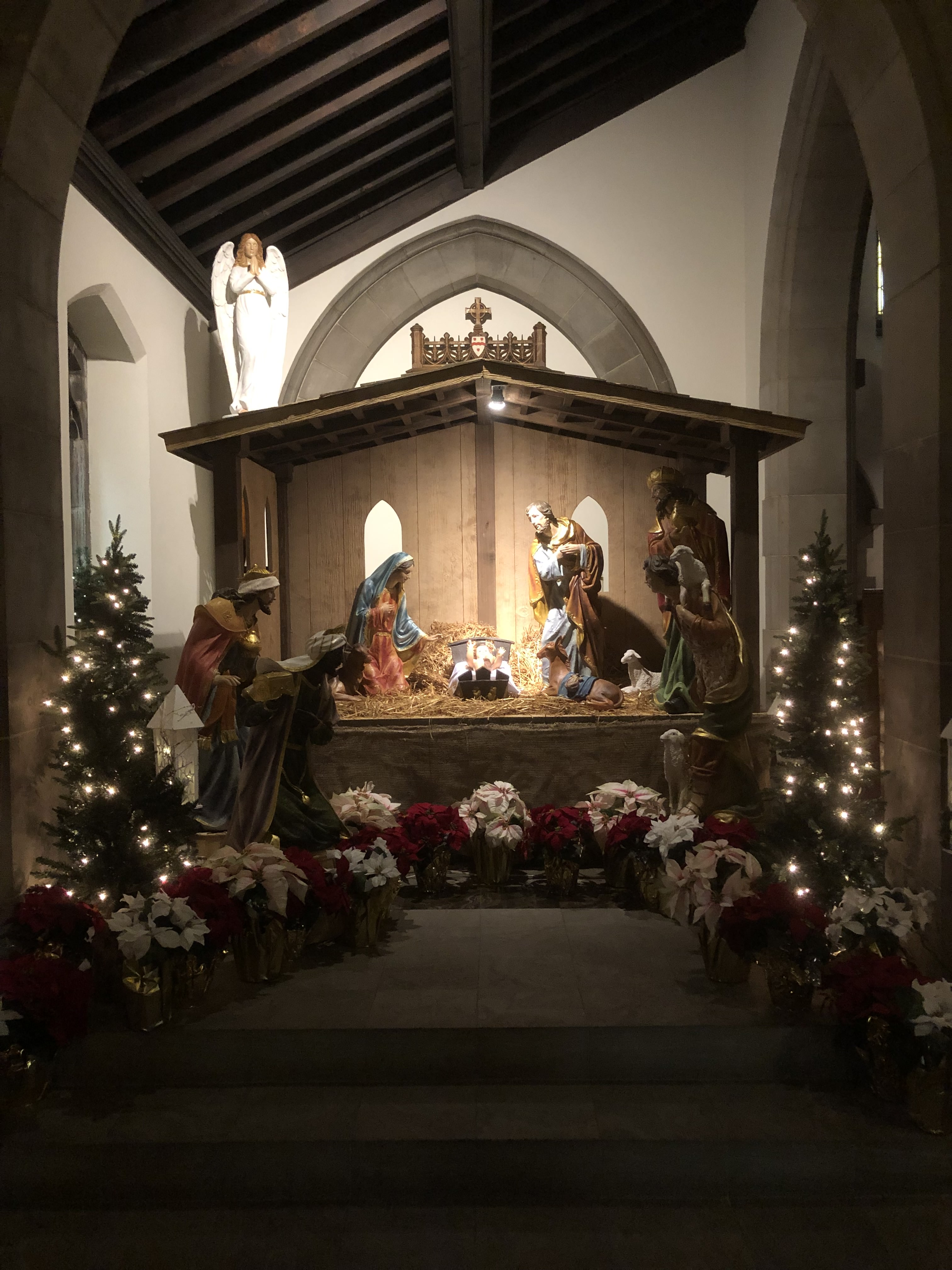
The Lady Chapel set up for Christmas

== Interior ==
The church was built using Credit Valley and Indiana limestone. The roof is supported by arch-braced trusses and beams made of dark stained British Columbia fir.

The windows installed in the west wall of the church in 2000 show Pope John XXIII, Kateri Tekakwitha, Jerzy Popiełuszko, Georges Vanier, Pauline Vanier, Gianna Beretta Molla, Franz Jägerstätter, Mother Teresa, Edith Stein, Thérèse of Lisieux, Óscar Romero, Pier Giorgio Frassati and André Bessette.

== Parish ==
The parish has two Sunday Masses every week, at 11:00am and at 7:00pm. It also holds daily Mass at 12:15pm from Monday to Friday and 9:30am Saturday. Confessions are available before all Masses. Since 2024, exposition of the Blessed Sacrament takes place Monday to Friday from 11:00am to 12:15pm.

=== Music ===
The church also has two music ministries; one for the 11:00 AM and another for the 7:00 PM Masses on Sundays.

The music ministry for the 11:00 AM Mass which is led by Lex Tan, solo cantor and pianist, playing music from GIA's RitualSong (2nd Edition) hymnal.

The 7:00 PM music ministry, led by Charles Min, plays in a contemporary style, influenced by pop, rock, folk, and musical theatre genres. They primarily use material from Christian Contemporary Music artists, and also use the Gather Hymnal. Their music ministry consists of a full rhythm section, violin, multiple cantors, and choir.

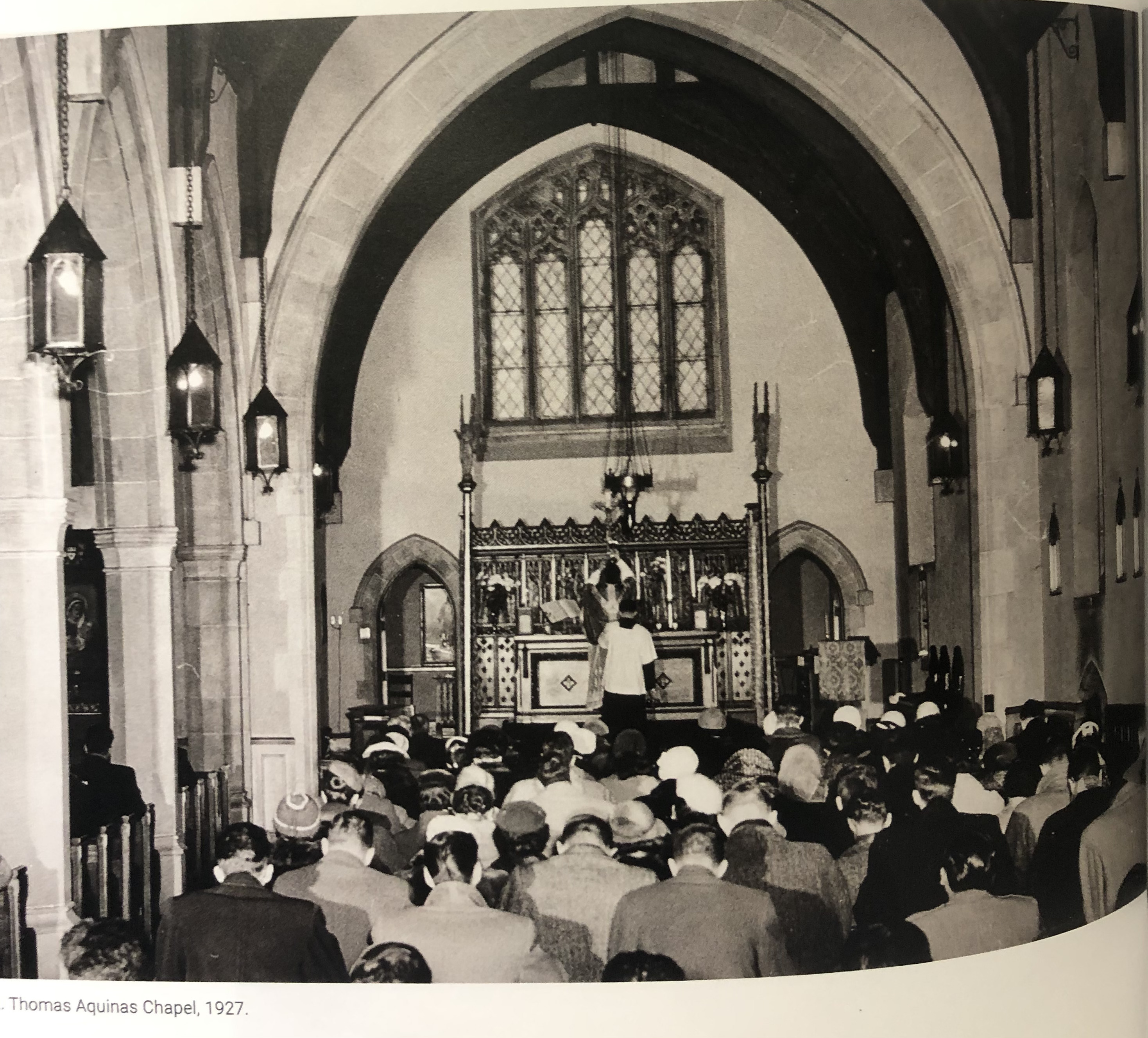
A mass at the St. Thomas Aquinas Chapel of Newman Centre in Toronto in 1927, now St. John Henry Newman Catholic Church.

=== Pastors and Executive Directors ===
- Father Thomas Rosica, CSB: 1994 - 2000
- Father Patrick O'Dea: 2000 - 2009
- Father Michael Machacek: 2009 - 2012
- Father Chris Cauchi: 2012 - 2016
- Father Peter Turrone: 2016 - 2021
- Father Marek Kolosowski: 2021 - 2025
- Father Michael Corpus: 2025 -

== Stained glass windows ==
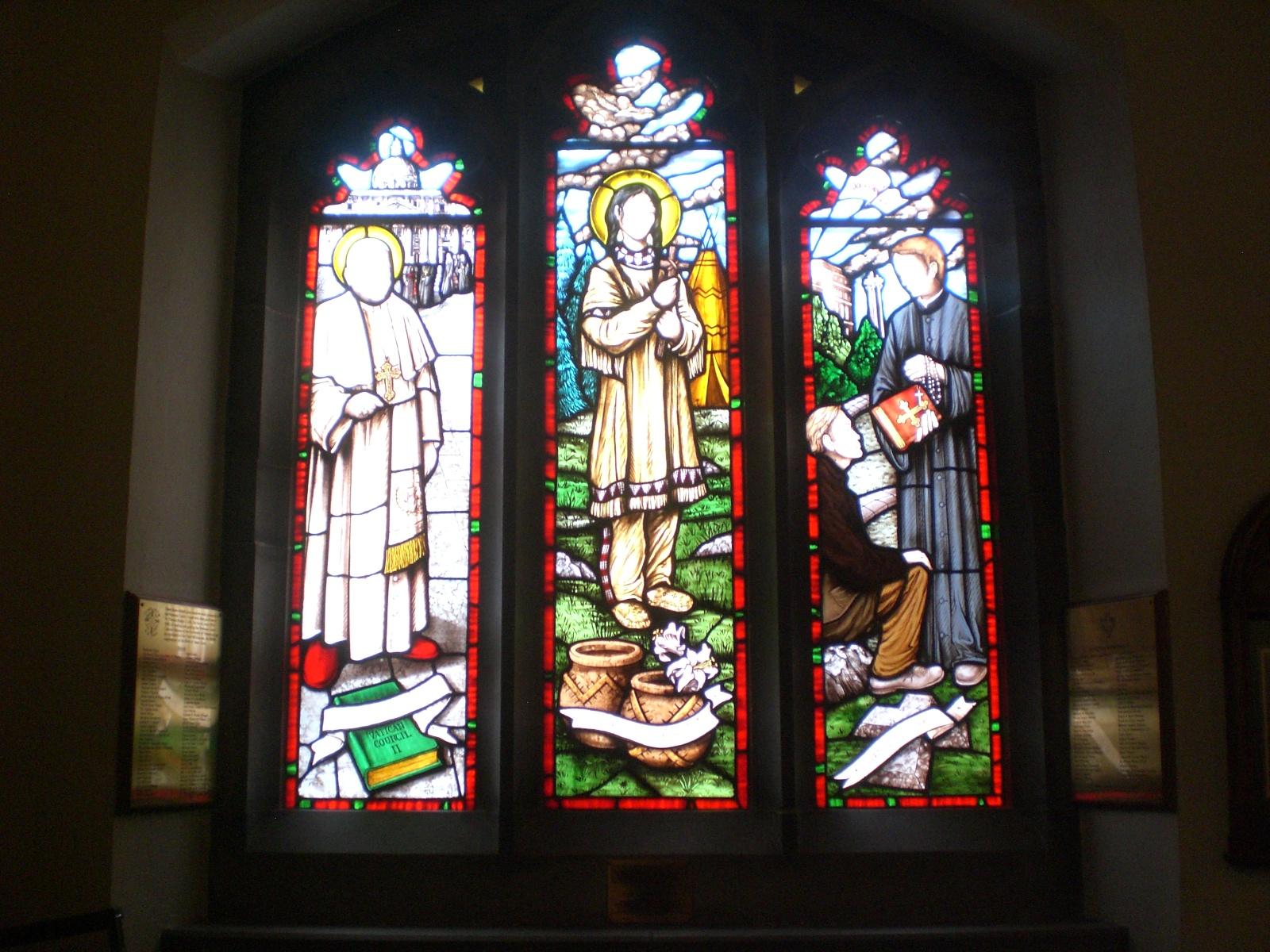
Stained glass west window depicting Pope John XXIII, Kateri Tekakwitha and Jerzy Popiełuszko

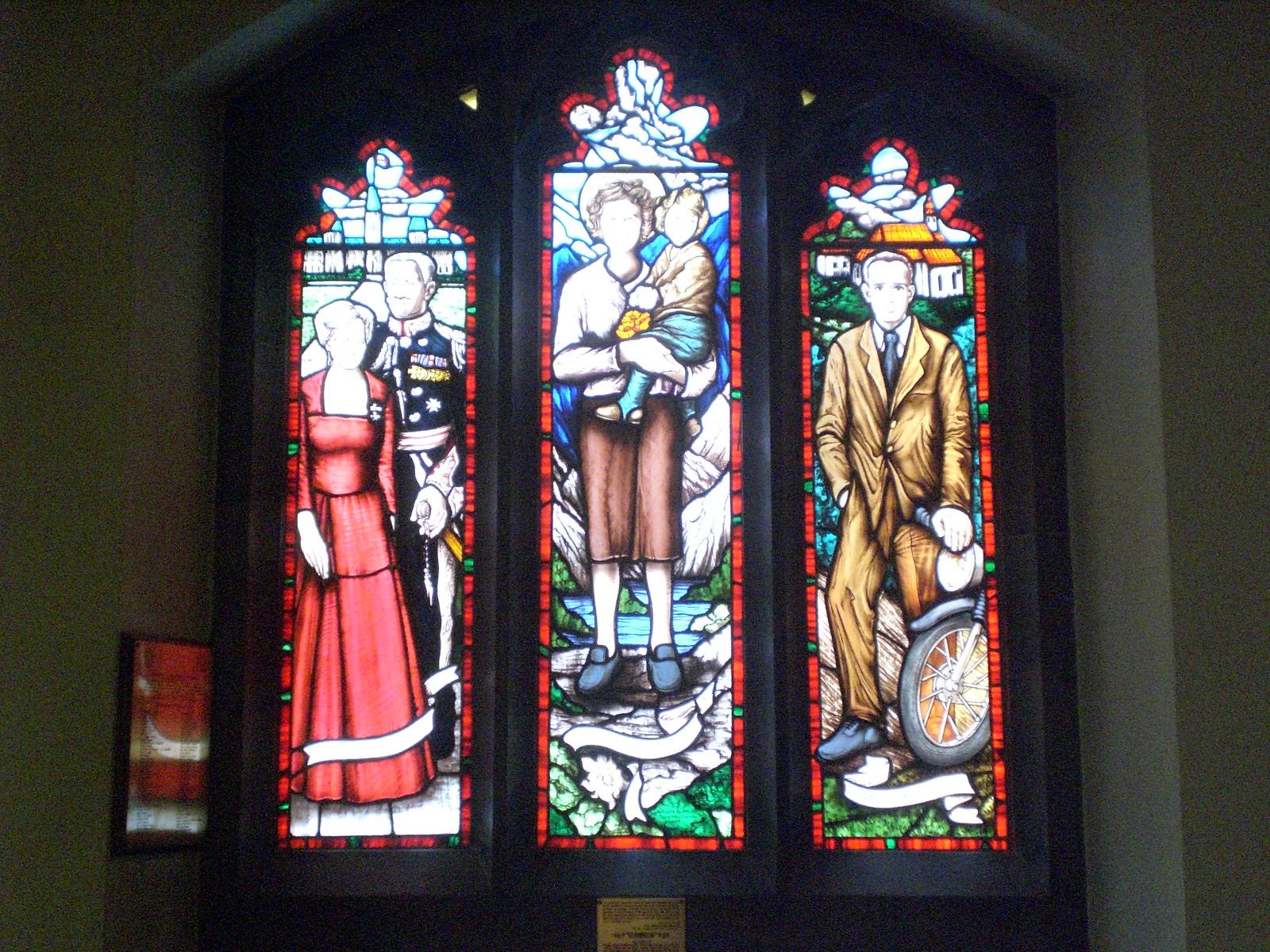
Stained glass west window depicting Pauline and Georges Vanier, Gianna Beretta Molla and Franz Jägerstätter

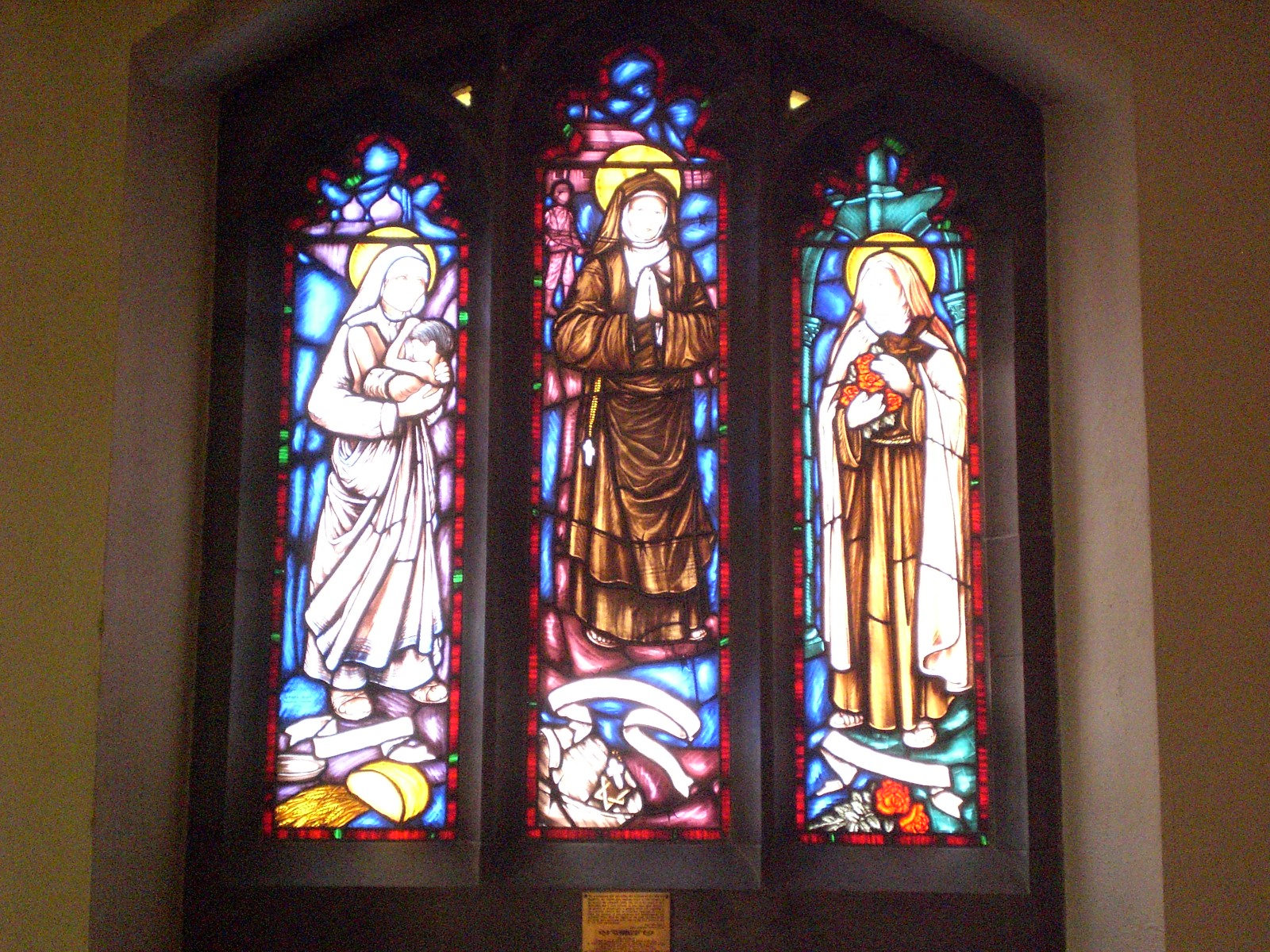
Stained glass west window depicting Mother Teresa, Edith Stein and Thérèse of Lisieux

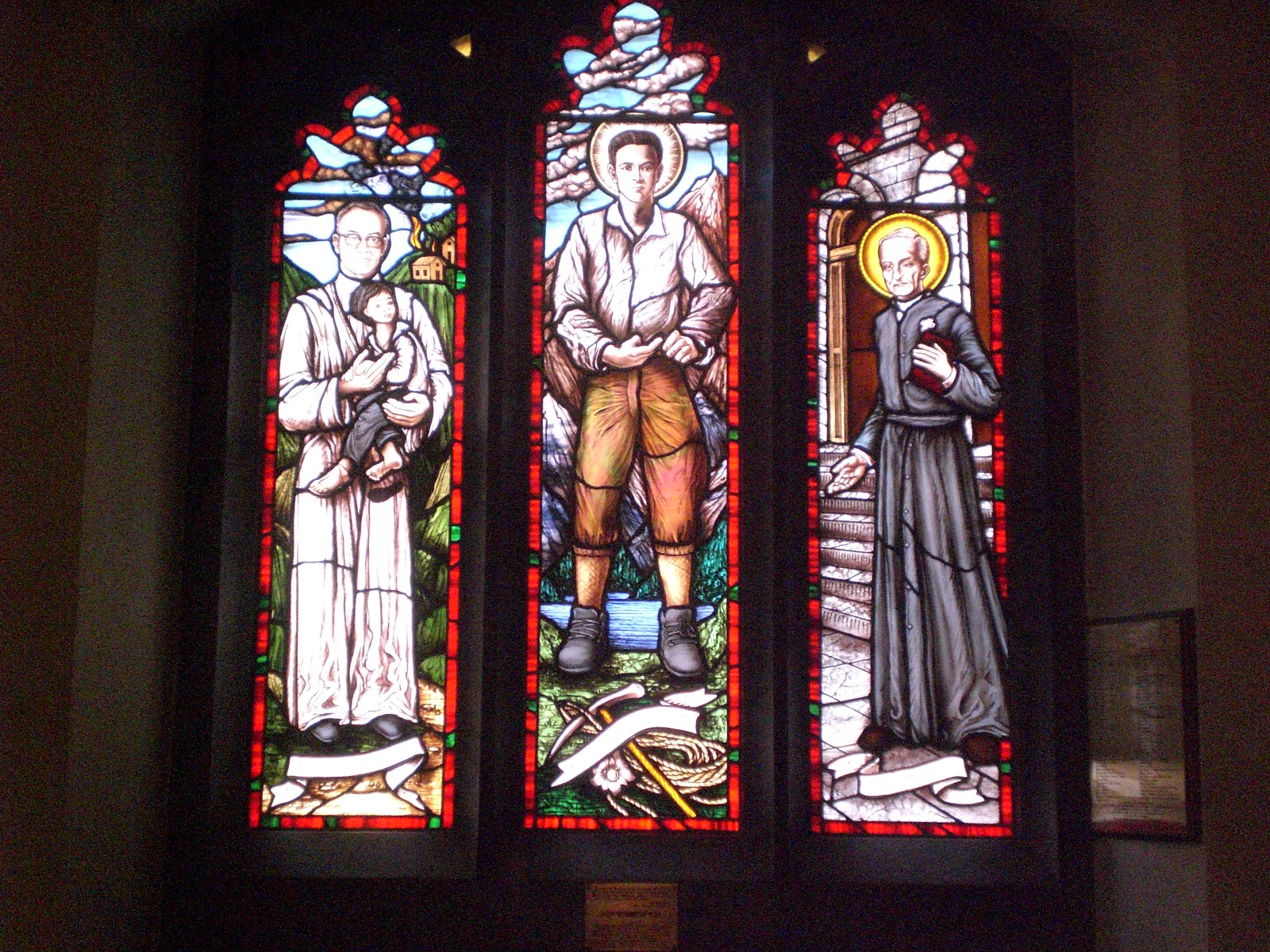
Stained glass west window depicting Óscar Romero, Pier Giorgio Frassati and André Bessette

== See also ==
- Newman Centre (Toronto)
