= Catholic campus ministry =

Catholic ministry at an educational institute

Catholic campus ministry is the practice of organizing and coordinating ministry or service of the Catholic Church on the campus of a school, college, or university. The activities of a Catholic campus ministry organization may entail the establishment of clubs, groups, and organizations, as well as the orchestration and execution of liturgies, retreats, or recollections. In addition, a Catholic campus ministry organization may conduct religion classes, workshops, or seminars. Some examples of Catholic campus ministry organizations include Newman Centers and the Catholic Student Association. Many Catholic campus ministry programs exist today because of the efforts of Cardinal Saint John Henry Newman.

== United States ==
In the United States, there are five organizations that coordinate Catholic campus ministry programs throughout the country. They are:

- Campus Ministry Association (CCMA)
- National Catholic Student Coalition (NCSC)
- Evangelical Catholic
- Newman Connection
- Fellowship of Catholic University Students (FOCUS)

== United Kingdom ==
- Oxford University Newman Society
