= Newman Centre (Toronto) =

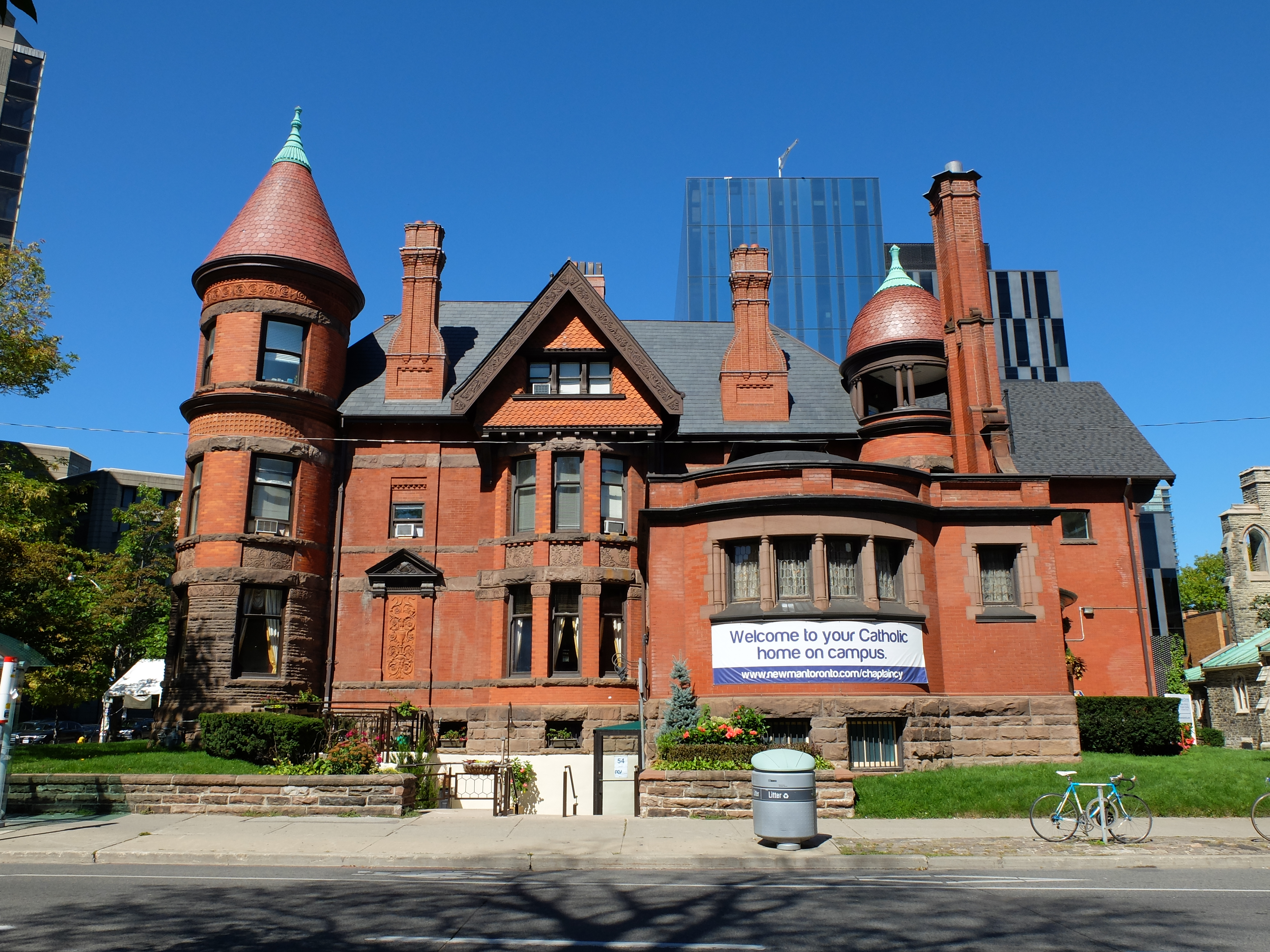
- South side of the building
- Interactive map of the Newman Centre area
- Former names: Matthews House

General information
- Type: Student Drop-in Centre and Residence
- Architectural style: Romanesque Revival
- Location: Hoskin Avenue, Toronto, Ontario, Canada
- Coordinates: 43.66444°N 79.39827°W
- Construction started: 1890
- Completed: 1891; 135 years ago
- Owner: Archdiocese of Toronto

Technical details
- Material: Terra cotta red bricks

Design and construction
- Architect: David Roberts

Other information
- Public transit: St. George

Website
- newmantoronto.com

Ontario Heritage Act
- Designated: July 4, 1981
- Reference no.: 10539

Newman Centre is the Roman Catholic university chaplaincy for the University of Toronto. It is housed in what was the home of Wilmot Deloui Matthews. It is located at the corner of Hoskin Avenue and St. George Street, across from the Robarts Library on the University of Toronto's St. George campus. It is under the direction of the Archdiocese of Toronto and is associated with the neighbouring St. John Henry Newman Catholic Church.

== Site history ==
=== Construction ===
The structure was built in 1890-1891 by the Canadian businessman "The Barley King of Canada" Wilmot Deloui Matthews, designed by Toronto architect David Roberts. It is constructed of red clay, terra-cotta bricks, plum-coloured Credit Valley sandstone and pressed terra-cotta decorative elements. In 1899, to celebrate his daughter's wedding, Matthews hired architect George M. Miller and sculptor Gustav Hahn to design an Art Nouveau ballroom in the house. In 1900, a larger kitchen was added. Later expansions would see an upper floor and basement being converted to create more living space.

Originally, there was a coach house adjacent to it. The coach house was later replaced by St. Thomas Aquinas Church, which was later rededicated to John Henry Newman after his canonization in 2019.

=== Purchase ===
In 1919, Matthews died. In 1922, the house was sold to the Newman Foundation. The Newman Foundation was a body created to purchase a suitable site for the local Newman Club. The Newman Club's purpose is to support Roman Catholic students in secular universities. The Newman Foundation was able to raise the necessary funds because of donations from two major benefactors, one of whom was Frank Patrick O'Connor. This allowed the foundation to purchase the property for the sum of $100,000.

The Newman Centre is one of the city's preserved examples of Romanesque Revival architecture. In 1977, it became one of the first buildings in Toronto to receive heritage status from the Ontario Heritage Trust. The cost of maintenance is met by the Archdiocese of Toronto. The site has been used for filming, including scenes from Spotlight, Suits, The Odd Squad and Storage Wars.

== Ministry ==
The students that live in the centre are known as Student Campus Ministers. This role was established by Fr. Thomas Rosica CSB in 1994. Until Fr Rosica's departure in 2000, the chaplaincy was administered by the Congregation of St. Basil. Originally, from 1913 to 1936 it was run by the Paulist Fathers. In 2000, the Basilians handed it over to the archdiocese who continue to serve the centre and parish. Today, ministry at the Newman Centre is delivered by the Pastoral Team, Student Campus Ministers, and the Newman Catholic Student Club.

== Exterior ==
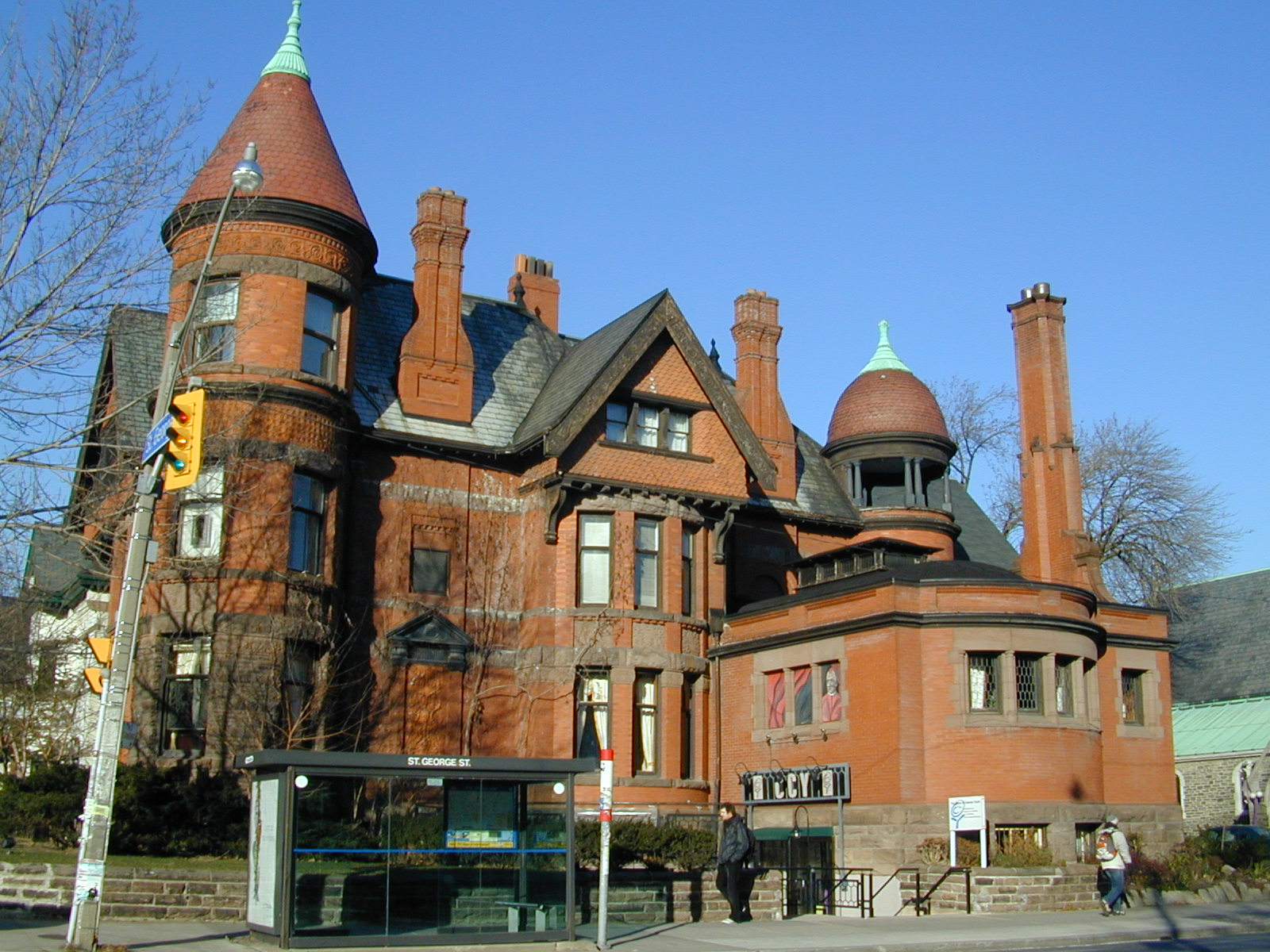
South side

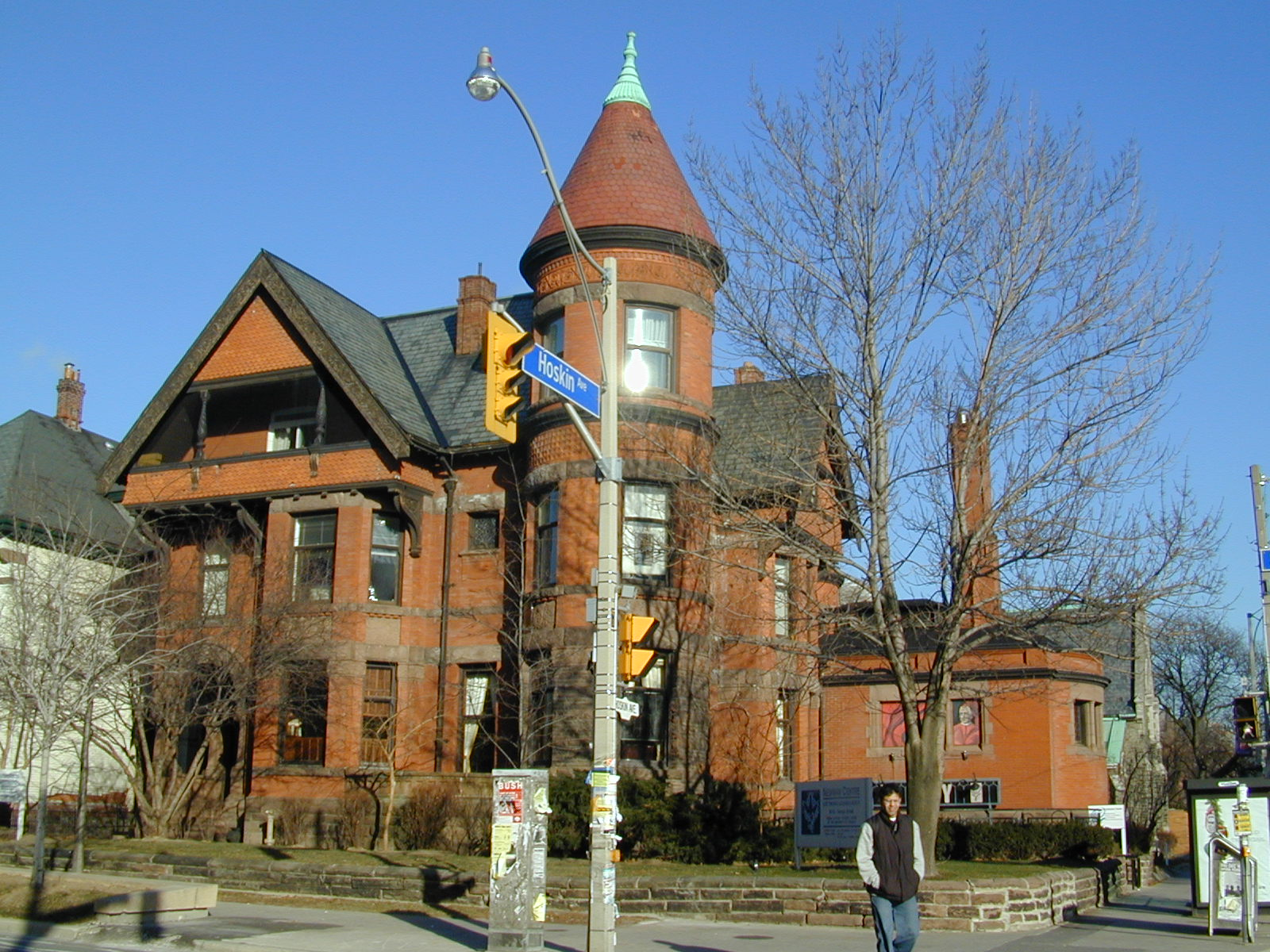
West side

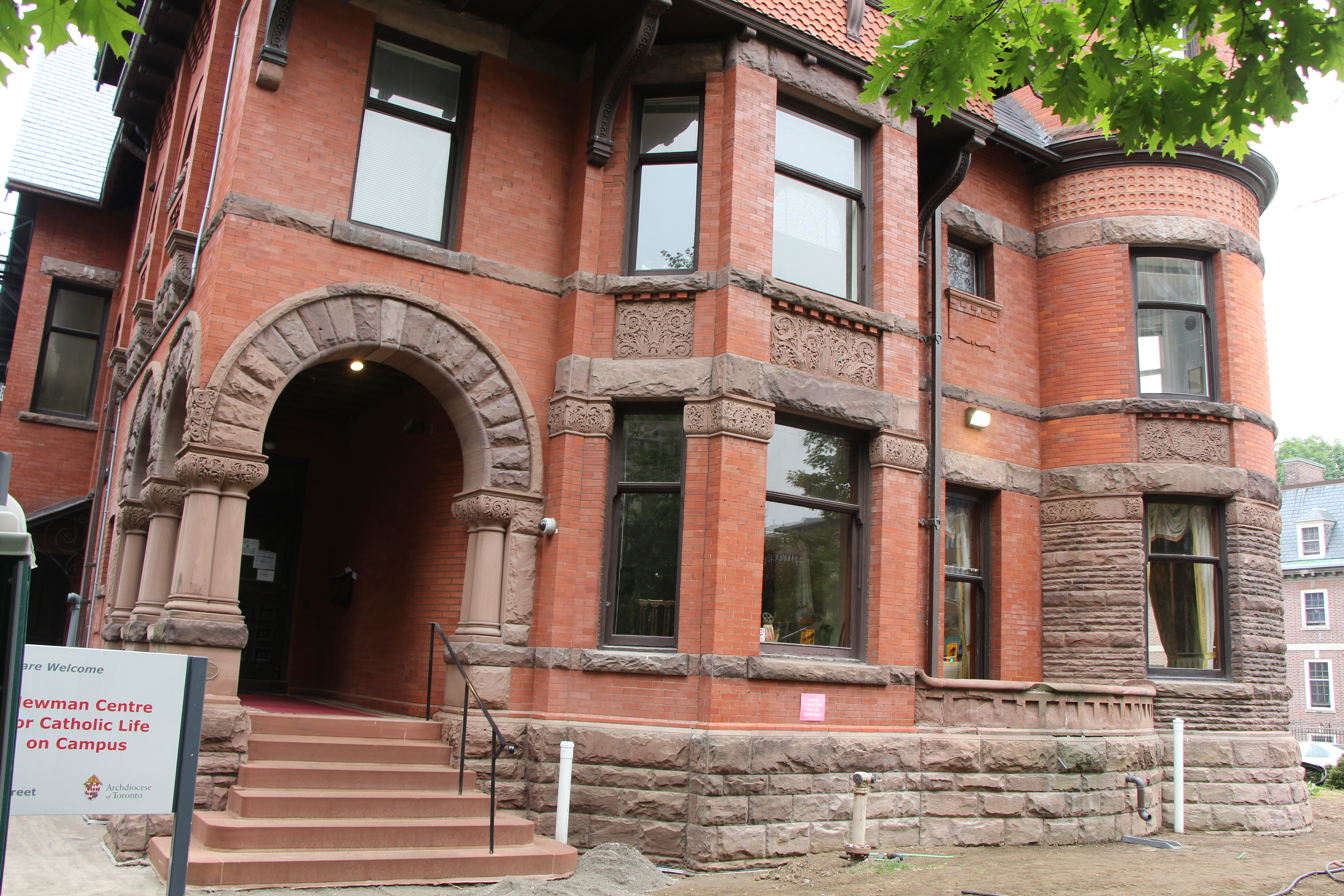
Entrance on west side

== See also ==
- St. John Henry Newman Catholic Church (Toronto)
- St. Basil's Church (Toronto)
- List of University of Toronto buildings
