= 40 Days for Life =

International organization

- Founded: 2004, Bryan-College Station, Texas, United States
- Type: 501(c)(3) non-profit
- Location: International
- Website: https://40daysforlife.com

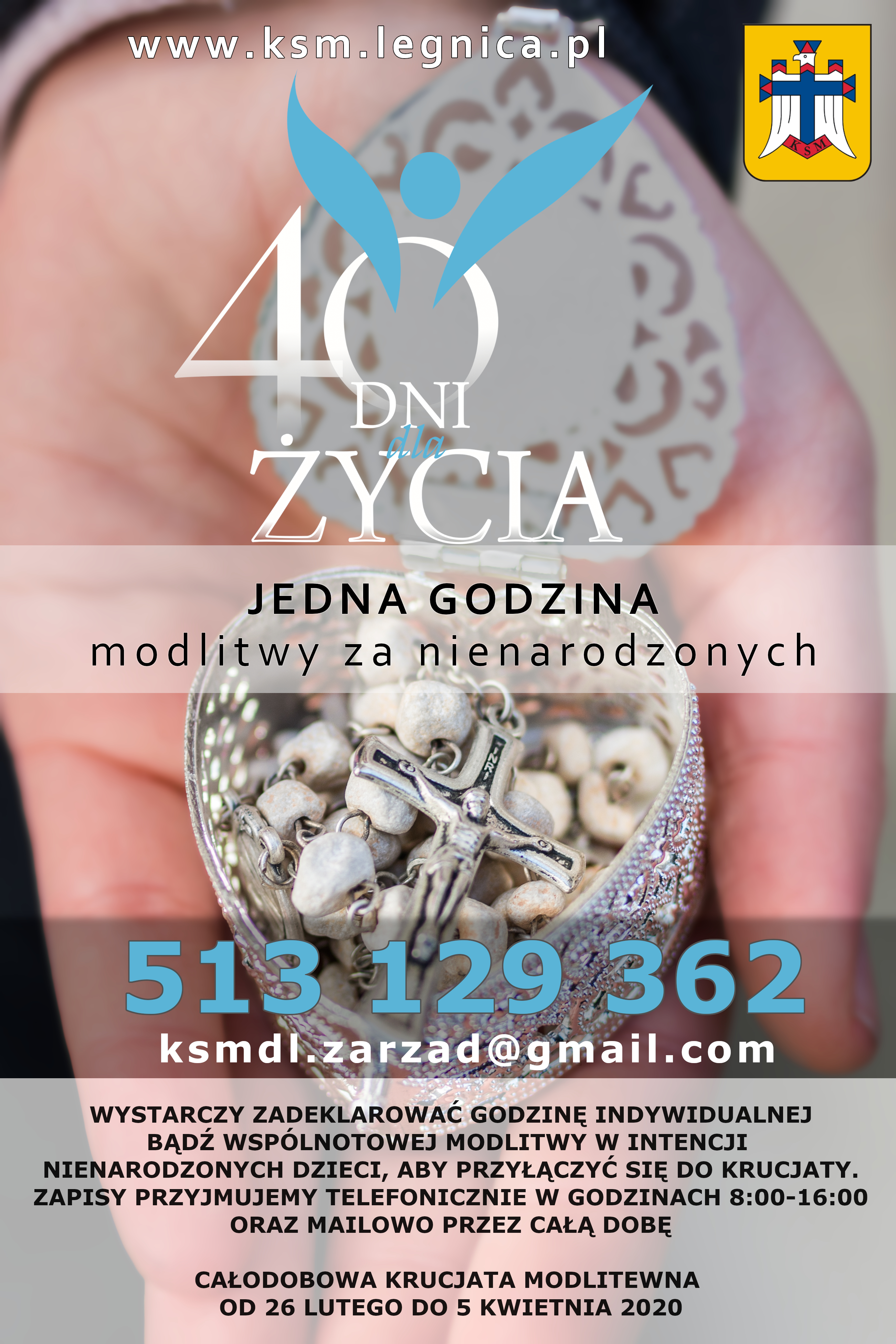
Poster for the Polish Branch of 40 Days for Life

40 Days for Life is an international organization that campaigns against abortion in more than 60 nations worldwide. It was originally started in 2004 by members of the Brazos Valley Coalition for Life in Texas. The name refers to a repeated pattern of events lasting for 40 days in the Bible, such as Noah's Ark, Moses's 40 days on Mount Sinai, and Jesus's 40 days in the desert.

The 40 Days for Life campaign is active in the spring during the Christian season of Lent and in the fall. Campaigns are organized simultaneously in hundreds of cities in the United States and around the world, although not all campaign locations participate every time. Each campaign consists of 40 days of prayer and fasting in shifts outside of a clinic or hospital that performs abortions or which is an abortion referral center. The campaign also involves outreach to the community to promote awareness about abortion and outreach directly to women considering abortion. Participants are required to sign a “Statement of Peace” stating that they will act lawfully and peacefully while participating in the campaign.

== History ==
The organization was founded in Bryan, Texas in 1998 by Shawn Carney, a Catholic student, in reaction to the presence of a Planned Parenthood clinic. ProLife 365 says that four members of the Brazos Valley Coalition for Life decided to start the prayer campaign 24 hours a day for 40 days with the goal of closing the facility, and credits this campaign for a rejuvenation of local anti-abortion activities in the Bryan-College Station area.

In early 2007, the original 40 Days for Life leaders suggested a simultaneous nationwide 40 Days for Life campaign in as many cities as wished to participate. The first national campaign ran that fall with vigils in 89 cities in 33 U.S. states. A second national campaign was added to run during the spring of each year, starting in Lent of 2008 with campaigns in 59 cities.

The spring 2009 campaign had numerous U.S. and international cities participating, including Brisbane, Australia and cities in Canada, Northern Ireland, and the United States. 40 Days for Life also began campaigning against clinics in Ireland prior to the 2018 constitutional amendment legalizing the procedure; such clinics gave information to women who were thinking of having an abortion in Britain, where abortion is widely legal.

In 2013, the Bryan Planned Parenthood clinic closed. In 2014, the building was bought by 40 Days for Life.

As of the spring 2019 campaign, more than 1,000,000 people have participated in 61 countries across all six populated continents. Lutherans for Life says that approximately 19,000 churches have participated in the 6,428 local campaigns that have been held since 40 Days for Life began. The US-based Christian Broadcasting Network reports that more than 16,000 confirmed instances where potential patients did not have a planned abortion. Campaigns continue to be held in the spring and fall of each year.

== Opposition ==
An American Civil Liberties Union spokesperson called 40 Days for Life "the most dangerous threat to choice". Abortion rights activists have reacted against 40 Days for Life with protests such as “40 Days of Choice”, among others. They have pursued legal avenues such as buffer zones, especially in Canada and Europe, to prevent anti-abortion activists from approaching patients or standing near abortion facilities.

In the United Kingdom, the 40 Days for Life campaign has been described as an "American-style" protest. Abortion rights activists say that harassment of clinic patients in the United Kingdom is increasing due to the campaign; 40 Days for Life denies that the campaign promotes harassment. The British Pregnancy Advisory Service states that some abortion appointments cancelled during a 40 Days for Life campaign or similar protest are rescheduled after the protest.

According to Holly Baxter, writing for the British publication The Guardian, the vigils' participants harass patients trying to access clinics by singing hymns, distributing rosaries, and distributing leaflets disguised as NHS literature, which are described by a Marie Stopes representative as "pseudo-medical" and "misleading".

40 Days for Life was condemned in 2020 by The Holocaust Memorial Day Trust for comparing abortion to the Holocaust.

== See also ==
- Anti-abortion organizations in the United States
- Choose Life license plates
