= Wilmot Deloui Matthews =

Canadian businessman

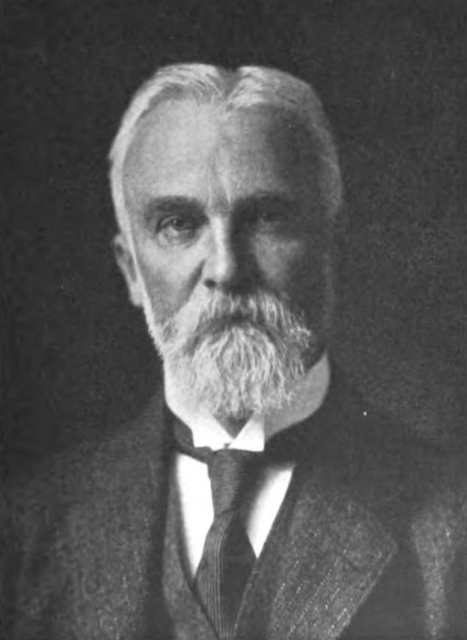
- Born: 22 June 1850; Burford Township, Upper Canada
- Died: 24 May 1919 (aged 68); Toronto, Ontario
- Occupation: Businessman
- Spouse: Annie Jane Love (m. 1872; died 1917)
- Children: 4

Wilmot Deloui Matthews (22 June 1850 – 24 May 1919) was a Canadian businessman and owner of W. D. Matthews and Company. He also served as a director of Dominion Bank, Hamilton Steel and Iron Company Limited, Canadian Pacific Railway, Canadian General Electric Company Limited and was president of the Toronto Board of Trade.

== Family ==
His paternal grandfather, Abner Matthews was a native of New Hampshire, settled in Burford before 1801 and was ordained as a Methodist Episcopal minister in 1820. His father Wheeler Matthews built up a business there as a miller and grain and produce dealer. In 1856, he and his family moved to Toronto, under the name W. D. Matthews and Company. Eventually known as the "barley king" of southwestern Ontario, he recognized the preference of American breweries for Canadian barley and engaged in cross-border trade, setting up regional bases in Le Roy and Attica, New York.

== Early life ==
Wilmot Matthews was born in the Burford Township in Upper Canada. After being educated at Toronto Normal School, Matthews entered his father's business as a clerk in 1867. He married Annie Jane Love on 29 August 1872 in Toronto, and they had two sons and two daughters. In 1873, he became a partner.

== Career ==
In the early 1880s his reputation in the grain trade was substantial enough that he was made president of the Toronto Corn Exchange Association, which he represented in 1883 before a parliamentary standing committee on the bill to form a court of railway commissioners in Canada. The deaths of Matthews' father in 1888 and his mother two years later left him in control of W. D. Matthews and Company. In 1893 he formed a malt dealership with Lionel Herbert Clarke (L. H. Clarke and Company); seven years later the two would also set up the Canada Malting Company Limited. In addition, by 1898 Matthews was a director of the Empire Produce Company and chairman of the government's eastern board for grain standards.

After the grain trade in Ontario went into decline he diversified by reinvesting into different sectors of the Ontario economy. His earliest interest was the Dominion Bank, of which he had become a director on 27 September 1882. He also became a director of Canadian Lloyds (a cargo company) and, in 1888, of the Canadian Pacific Railway. In 1888–89 he served as president of the Toronto Board of Trade, in which office he presided over the erection of the board's new building at Yonge and Front. By 1891, he had built a stone house at Hoskin Avenue and St George Street, which became the Newman Centre, Toronto.

From Wilfrid Laurier's election as prime minister in 1896 to the merger boom of 1909–13, many large-scale Canadian companies merged. As president of the Toronto Incandescent Electric Light Company Limited, he began working with Frederic Nicholls. He was a director of the Canadian General Electric Company Limited.

Matthews, in partnership with Edmund Boyd Osler, owned a sizeable share of the Hamilton Steel and Iron Company Limited and worked with him at Dominion Bank. With Osler he was behind the merger of two cement mills to form the Canadian Portland company. During the recession in the Canadian cement industry in 1908, Matthews sold Canadian Portland for $1.4 million to William Maxwell Aitken, which became Canada Cement in August 1909.

== Legacy ==
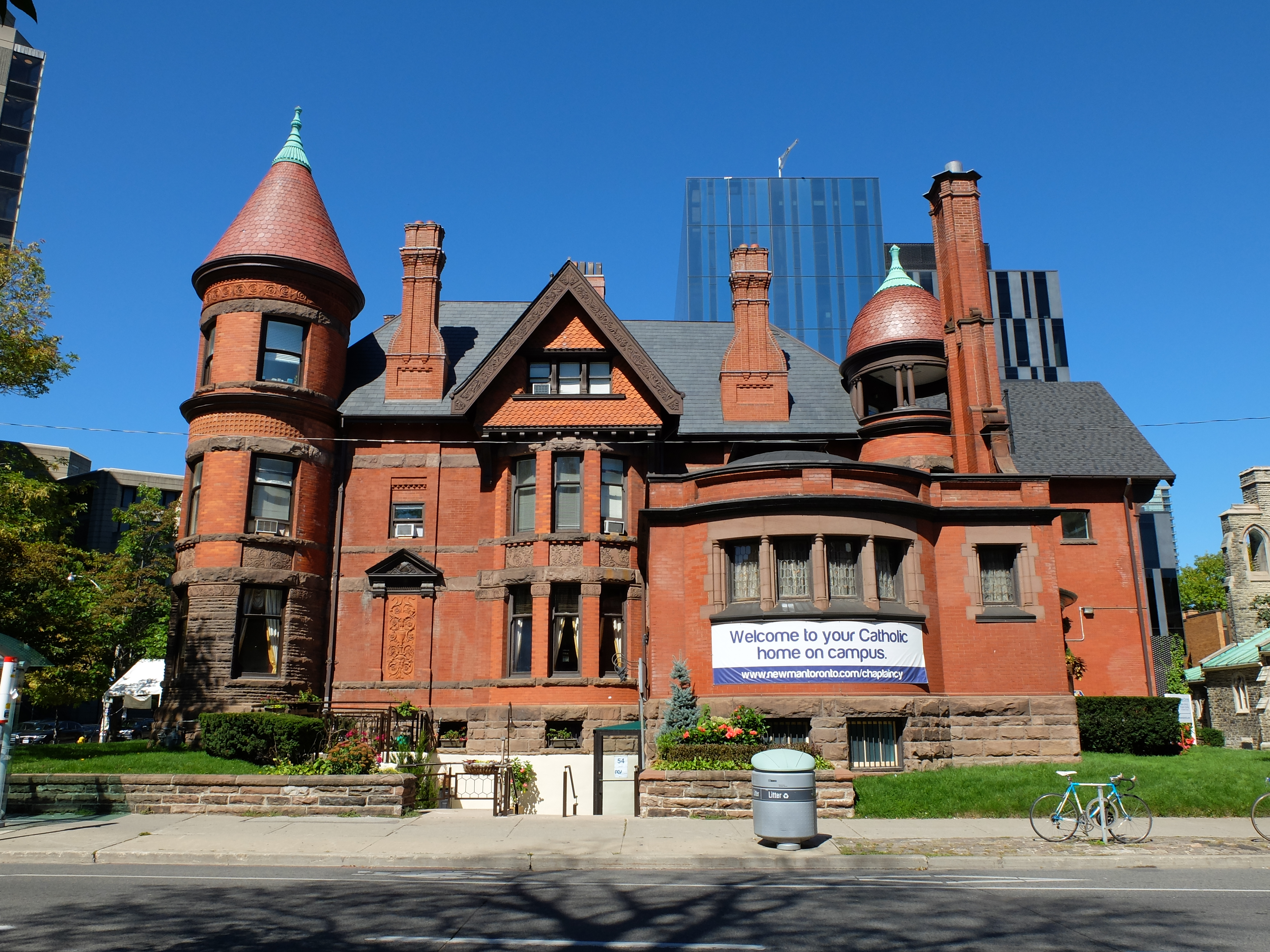
W. D. Matthews' house in Toronto

In 1913, Henry Robert Emmerson said that Matthews, based on his presence in 18 companies, was one of the 23 "capitalist-directors" who "are the directive forces in practically all of Canada's economic life." In 1909 Nathaniel Samuel Fineberg had stated in Moody's Magazine, from the sheer number of Matthews's directorships (17), that he was the second most influential business figure in Canada.

His wife died in 1917 and two years he suffered a stroke and then died of pneumonia at his home in Toronto. He was buried in Mount Pleasant Cemetery.

== See also ==
- Edmund Boyd Osler
