= George A. Bray =

American obesity researcher (born 1931)

- Born: July 25, 1931 (age 95); Evanston, Illinois
- Education: Brown University, Harvard Medical School
- Known for: Obesity research
- Spouse: Yes
- Children: 4
- Awards: 1988 Osborne and Mendel Award from the American Institute of Nutrition, 1994 Joseph Goldberger Award from the American Medical Association
- Scientific career
- Fields: Endocrinology

George A. Bray (born July 25, 1931) is an American obesity researcher. As of 2016, he is a University Professor emeritus and formerly the chief of the division of clinical obesity and metabolism at Louisiana State University's Pennington Biomedical Research Center in Baton Rouge. He is also a Boyd Professor emeritus at the Pennington Center, and a professor of medicine emeritus at the Louisiana State University Medical Center.

== Early life and education ==
Bray was born on July 25, 1931, in Evanston, Illinois. He received his A.B. from Brown University in 1953 (Summa cum Laude and valedictorian), and his M.D. from Harvard Medical School in 1957 (Magna cum laude). He subsequently interned on the Osler Service of the Johns Hopkins Hospital in Baltimore, MD, served as a research associate at the National Institutes of Health where his mentor was Robert W. Berliner, M.D., a fellow at the National Institute for Medical Research under mentor Rosalind Pitt-Rivers, Ph.D., and a fellow at New England Medical Center, in Boston, under mentor Edwin (Ted) Astwood, M.D., Ph.D.

== Academic career ==
Bray began his academic career at the Tufts-New England Medical Center, in Boston in 1964. In 1970, Bray became the director of the Clinical Research Center at the Harbor–UCLA Medical Center, Torrance, CA. In between his time at UCLA and his move to the University of Southern California in 1982 as Chief of Diabetes, Bray served as the first nutrition coordinator in the Office of the Assistant Secretary for Health in the US Department of Health and Human Services in Washington, D.C. In 1989, he became the first executive director of the Pennington Biomedical Research Center, a position he continued to hold until 1999 when he returned to his research career. In 1976, he founded the International Journal of Obesity with Alan Howard, and in 1982, he founded the North American Association for the Study of Obesity (since renamed The Obesity Society). In 1993, he established the journal Obesity Research (now known as Obesity), and served as its editor-in-chief from then until 1997. He was also the founder of the journal Endocrine Practice, serving as its editor-in-chief from 1995 to 1996.

== Research work ==
Since he received his M.D., Bray has spent nearly all his time researching obesity. One of his most cited papers published while at the National Institutes of Health was for a method of measuring radioactivity in aqueous solutions called "Bray's Solution". This work was conducted while in Boston and Los Angeles and focused on clinical and basic scientific studies relating to mechanisms for development of obesity. After moving to the Pennington Center in 1989 he began research focused on clinical studies. He proposed an endocrine and metabolic hypothesis for obesity. He also explored obesity in patients with hypothalamic injury and in patients with the Prader-Willi Syndrome. After moving to the Pennington Center in 1989 Bray began research which focused mainly on clinical studies. He has proposed that increasing fructose consumption may be a major contributor to rising rates of obesity. (F). He was co-investigator a clinical study which found that strict adherence to reduced consumption of all calories is more effective for weight loss than strict adherence to a reduced proportion of carbohydrates, fat, or protein. This study also showed a way to use genetic information to develop personalized dietary advice. Bray was one of the investigators who developed the DASH Diet which is now recommended by the Dietary Guidelines and U.S. News & World Report. He was actively involved in the Diabetes Prevention Program and the Look AHEAD clinical trial. Most recently he has explored the consequences of different levels of dietary protein during periods with excess calorie intake.

== Memberships ==
Bray is a member of numerous professional organizations including The Obesity Society, The Endocrine Society, the American Diabetes Association, the American Association of Clinical Endocrinologists, and the American Physiological Society. He received the Goldberger Award from the American Medical Association, was elected to the Society of Scholars at Johns Hopkins University, received the Osborne and Mendel Award from the American Society for Nutrition, the McCollum Award from the American Society of Clinical Nutrition, the Mead-Johnson Award and the Tops Award, Friends of Mickey Stunkard Award and Presidential Medal from the Obesity Society as well as the Wilbur O. Atwater Award from the Agricultural Research Service of the USDA in 2019.

== Selected publications ==
References to original Articles are cited with alphabetical listings.

- Bray GA (2015). "Why Obesity". Annual Review of Nutrition. 35: 1–31. doi:10.1146/annurev-nutr-121214-104412. PMID 26185976.
- Bray G.A. (1960). "A simple efficient liquid scintillator for counting aqueous solutions in a liquid scintillation counter". Analytical Biochemistry. 1 (4–5): 279–285. doi:10.1016/0003-2697(60)90025-7.
- Bray G.A., York D.A. (1979). "Hypothalamic and genetic obesity in experimental animals: An autonomic and endocrine hypothesis". Physiological Reviews. 59 (3): 719–809. doi:10.1152/physrev.1979.59.3.719. PMID 379887.
- Bray GA, Gallagher TF (1975). "Manifestations of hypothalamic obesity in man: a comprehensive investigation of eight patients and a review of the literature". Medicine (Baltimore). 54 (4): 301–30. doi:10.1097/00005792-197507000-00002. PMID 1152672. S2CID 22332621.
- Bray GA, Dahms WT, Swerdloff RS, Fiser RH, Atkinson RL, Carrel RE (1983). "The Prader-Willi syndrome: a study of 40 patients and a review of the literature". Medicine (Baltimore). 62 (2): 59–80. doi:10.1097/00005792-198303000-00001. PMID 6338343. S2CID 25114211.
- Bray GA, Popkin BM (2013). "Calorie-sweetened beverages and fructose: what have we learned 10 years later". Pediatric Obesity. 8 (4): 242–8. doi:10.1111/j.2047-6310.2013.00171.x. PMID 23625798. S2CID 24975379.
- Sacks FM, Bray GA, Carey VJ; et al. (February 2009). "Comparison of weight-loss diets with different compositions of fat, protein, and carbohydrates". New England Journal of Medicine. 360 (9): 859–73. doi:10.1056/NEJMoa0804748. PMC 2763382. PMID 19246357.
- Bray G.A., Vollmer W.M., Sacks F.M., Obarzanek E., Svetkey L., Appel L.J. (2004). "A further subgroup analysis of the effects of the DASH diet and three dietary sodium levels on blood pressure: Results of the DASH-Sodium Trial". American Journal of Cardiology. 94 (2): 222–227. doi:10.1016/j.amjcard.2004.03.070. PMID 15246908.
- Bray GA, Smith SR, de Jonge L, Xie H, Rood J, Martin CK, Most M, Brock C, Mancuso S, Redman L (2012). "Effect of dietary protein content on weight gain, energy expenditure, and body composition during overeating: a randomized controlled trial". Journal of the American Medical Association. 307 (1): 47–55. doi:10.1001/jama.2011.1918. PMC 3777747. PMID 22215165.
- George A. Bray, MD, an oral history conducted in 2014 by Michael Chappelle, The Endocrine Society, The Clark Sawin Library, Washington, DC 2014.
