= Derek LeRoith =

South African endocrinologist

Derek LeRoith is an endocrinologist, originally from South Africa, and working for the past two decades in the United States. He is a Professor of Medicine and the current Chief of the Hilda and J. Lester Gabrilove, M.D. Division of Endocrinology, Diabetes and Bone Disease and Director of the Metabolism Institute of the Mount Sinai Medical Center in New York City. He is an international expert in insulin-like growth factor-1 (IGF-1).

LeRoith was the first to demonstrate the link between insulin-like growth factor-1 (IGF-1) and cancer.

== Biography ==
LeRoith was born in 1945 in South Africa. He earned both his M.B. Ch.B. and his Ph.D. from the University of Cape Town. In 1974, he became a fellow of the College of Physicians of South Africa, and, in 1975, he became a member of the Royal College of Physicians of the United Kingdom. His post-doctoral training included a residency in pediatrics at the Kaplan Medical Center in Rehovot, Israel, an endocrine research fellowship at the University of Cape Town, and a residency in medicine and geriatrics at Middlesex Hospital in London.

In Israel, LeRoith held a lectureship in medicine and endocrinology at the Ben-Gurion University of the Negev. In 1979, he joined the United States' National Institutes of Health and eventually became the Chief of its Diabetes Branch of the Institute of Diabetes and Digestive and Kidney Diseases.

LeRoith is a board member for the Council for the Advancement of Diabetes Research and Education and the Endocrine Fellows Foundation. He serves on the scientific advisory board of Medingo, Ltd. and is a past member of the national board of directors for the American Diabetes Association. He has served on the editorial board of 18 journals, including Endocrinology, Experimental Cell Research, the Journal of Clinical Endocrinology and Metabolism, the Journal of Clinical Investigation, the American Journal of Physiology and the Journal of Biological Chemistry. He served on the review committees of the United States Department of Veterans Affairs and the American Diabetes Association. He is also the editor-in-chief of Frontiers in Endocrinology and Endocrine Practice.

== Honors and awards ==
- 1963 Medal for Physiology
- 1966 Medal for Obstetrics and Gynecology
- 1973 Bronte Stewart Award for Ph.D. Thesis
- 1996 British Endocrine Society Transatlantic Medal
- 1996 The Herman O. Mosenthal Memorial Lecture
- 2004 The Yogesh C. Patel Memorial Lecture
- 2008 Dell Fisher Visiting professor, UCLA

== Books ==
Partial list:

- Diabetes Mellitus: a Fundamental and Clinical text, Derek LeRoith (Editor), Simeon I. Taylor (Editor) and Jerrold M Olefsky (Editor), 2003 (Third Edition), ISBN 0-7817-4097-5
- Molecular Biology of Diabetes, Part I: Autoimmunity and Genetics; Insulin Synthesis and Secretion, Boris Draznin (Editor), Derek LeRoith (Editor), 1994, ISBN 0-89603-286-8
- Molecular Biology of Diabetes, Part II: Insulin Action, Effects on Gene Expression and Regulation, and Glucose Transport, Boris Draznin (Editor), Derek LeRoith (Editor), 1994, ISBN 0-89603-287-6
- Insulin-like Growth Factors: Molecular and Cellular Aspects, Derek LeRoith (Author), 1991, ISBN 0-8493-5712-8
- Controversies in Treating Diabetes: Clinical and Research Aspects (Contemporary Endocrinology), Derek LeRoith (Editor), Aaron I. Vinik (Editor), 2008, ISBN 1-58829-708-X

== Publications ==
Partial list:

- Fierz Y, Novosyadlyy R, Vijayakumar A, Yakar S, LeRoith D (March 2010). "Insulin-sensitizing therapy attenuates type 2 diabetes-mediated mammary tumor progression". Diabetes. 59 (3): 686–93. doi:10.2337/db09-1291. PMC 2828655. PMID 19959755.
- Wu Y, Wang C, Sun H, LeRoith D, Yakar S (2009). "High-efficient FLPo deleter mice in C57BL/6J background". PLOS ONE. 4 (11) e8054. Bibcode:2009PLoSO...4.8054W. doi:10.1371/journal.pone.0008054. PMC 2777316. PMID 19956655.
- LeRoith D (December 2009). "Pediatric endocrinology: Part II. Foreword". Endocrinol. Metab. Clin. North Am. 38 (4): xi–xiii. doi:10.1016/j.ecl.2009.09.006. PMID 19944284.
- Vijayakumar A, Novosyadlyy R, Wu Y, Yakar S, LeRoith D (February 2010). "Biological effects of growth hormone on carbohydrate and lipid metabolism". Growth Horm. IGF Res. 20 (1): 1–7. doi:10.1016/j.ghir.2009.09.002. PMC 2815161. PMID 19800274.
- Leroith D (September 2009). "Pediatric endocrinology: part I. Foreword". Endocrinol. Metab. Clin. North Am. 38 (3): xi–xiii. doi:10.1016/j.ecl.2009.07.004. PMID 19716998.
- Novosyadlyy R, Vijayakumar A, Lann D, Fierz Y, Kurshan N, LeRoith D (October 2009). "Physical and functional interaction between polyoma virus middle T antigen and insulin and IGF-I receptors is required for oncogene activation and tumour initiation". Oncogene. 28 (39): 3477–86. doi:10.1038/onc.2009.209. PMC 2756316. PMID 19617901.
- LeRoith D (2009). "Gender differences in metabolic disorders". Gend Med. 6 Suppl 1: 1–3. doi:10.1016/j.genm.2009.02.003. PMID 19318215.
- Wu Y, Sun H, Yakar S, LeRoith D (September 2009). "Elevated levels of insulin-like growth factor (IGF)-I in serum rescue the severe growth retardation of IGF-I null mice". Endocrinology. 150 (9): 4395–403. doi:10.1210/en.2009-0272. PMC 2819739. PMID 19497975.
- Kawashima Y, Chen J, Sun H; et al. (July 2009). "Apolipoprotein E deficiency abrogates insulin resistance in a mouse model of type 2 diabetes mellitus". Diabetologia. 52 (7): 1434–41. doi:10.1007/s00125-009-1378-8. PMC 5488278. PMID 19436992.
- LeRoith D (March 2009). "Basic aspects and clinical applicability in the field of lipidology. Foreword". Endocrinol. Metab. Clin. North Am. 38 (1): xiii–xv. doi:10.1016/j.ecl.2009.01.015. PMID 19217508.
- Kawashima Y, Fritton JC, Yakar S; et al. (April 2009). "Type 2 diabetic mice demonstrate slender long bones with increased fragility secondary to increased osteoclastogenesis". Bone. 44 (4): 648–55. doi:10.1016/j.bone.2008.12.012. PMC 2659558. PMID 19150422.
- Hong SH, Briggs J, Newman R; et al. (May 2009). "Murine osteosarcoma primary tumour growth and metastatic progression is maintained after marked suppression of serum insulin-like growth factor I". Int. J. Cancer. 124 (9): 2042–9. doi:10.1002/ijc.24169. PMC 6948843. PMID 19132750.
- Radbill B, Murphy B, LeRoith D (December 2008). "Rationale and strategies for early detection and management of diabetic kidney disease". Mayo Clin. Proc. 83 (12): 1373–81. doi:10.1016/S0025-6196(11)60786-6 (inactive 8 October 2025). PMID 19046557.
- Lann D, LeRoith D (December 2008). "The role of endocrine insulin-like growth factor-I and insulin in breast cancer". J Mammary Gland Biol Neoplasia. 13 (4): 371–9. doi:10.1007/s10911-008-9100-x. PMID 19030972.
