= Louis Aronne =

American physician and author

Louis J. Aronne is an American physician and author who is an obesity medicine specialist. He is quoted in the news media as an expert in the field of weight research. He is perhaps best known for diagnosing David Letterman's heart condition in 2000. His book, released in 2009, The Skinny on Losing Weight Without Being Hungry is a NY Times best-seller. His book, The Change Your Biology Diet: The Proven Program for Lifelong Weight Loss with a foreword by David Letterman was published on January 5, 2016.

== Early life and education ==
Aronne was born in Brooklyn, NY, to parents of Italian descent. He graduated from Poly Prep Country Day School in 1973 and graduated Phi Beta Kappa from Trinity College in 1977 with a Bachelor of Science in biochemistry. In 1981, he graduated from The Johns Hopkins University School of Medicine. He is board certified in Internal Medicine and founding board member and diplomate of the American Board of Obesity Medicine.

== Career ==
Aronne is the Sanford I. Weill Professor of Metabolic Research and Professor of Clinical Medicine at Weill Cornell Medical College, an attending physician at New York Presbyterian Hospital, and an Adjunct Clinical Associate Professor of Medicine at Columbia University College of Physicians and Surgeons. He is medical director of the Comprehensive Weight Control Center at Weill Cornell Medicine, which he founded in 1986 as a multidisciplinary obesity research and treatment program.

Aronne is a past president of The Obesity Society, then known as the North American Association for the Study of Obesity. He is a fellow of the: American College of Physicians, The Obesity Society, and the New York Academy of Medicine. In 2013, he was made an honorary member of the Academy of Nutrition and Dietetics.

Aronne edited and was chairman of the National Institutes of Health's Practical Guide to the Identification, Evaluation, and Treatment of Overweight and Obesity in Adults. He was a reviewing member of the Department of Health and Human Services and Food and Drug Administration's publication, Guidance for the Clinical Evaluation of Weight-Control Drugs. Aronne also helped develop the Veterans Administration MOVE! Program, the largest weight loss program in the U.S.

Aronne is an associate editor of the peer-reviewed scientific journal, Obesity. He has been a consultant to the Food and Drug Administration and the Federal Trade Commission. He has authored over 100 scientific publications, book chapters, abstracts, and books on obesity.

In 2008, Aronne founded BMIQ, which is now Intellihealth Evolve, a SaaS platform designed to treat obesity within a medically supervised setting. The Evolve platform provides clinical decision support tools for physicians, nurse practitioners, registered dietitians, exercise physiologists, and behavioral psychologists with evidence based diagnosis, treatment recommendations, and telehealth/telemedicine tools to remotely monitor patients with obesity as a disease.

== Medical philosophy ==
Aronne supports the creation of the obesity medicine sub-specialty within the American Board of Internal Medicine. Aronne's core belief is that obesity is a progressive metabolic disease of weight-regulating mechanisms, which leads to a deterioration in fullness and satiety. Wherein the "feed-forward" phenomenon, caused by leptin resistance, appetite is stimulated, rather than inhibited, by eating. The final stage of the fullness mechanism breakdown, which Aronne has termed "fullness resistance", is the delayed or nonexistent sensation of fullness.

His approach towards obesity treatment is to first diagnose and treat sleep disorders and review patients' medications. He has found that many patients take common[medications that neither they, nor their doctor realize cause weight gain. He substitutes these with weight-neutral or weight-reducing medications. This is the basis of his "weight-centric", as opposed to the dated "gluco-centric", approach to Type 2 diabetes.

Aronne's diet recommendations are based on the low-glycemic and Mediterranean diets with an added "food order" modification. His recommendation, supported by his food order research at Weill Cornell Medicine, is to consume protein and vegetables first (both within the context of a meal and a day) followed later by consuming whole grain carbohydrates.

== Media ==
Aronne was one of the founding hosts of the TV Food Network, co-hosting more than 650 episodes of Getting Healthy, a nightly call-in show covering a variety of topics in health, nutrition, and medicine from 1993 to 1996. His other television and radio appearances include The Charlie Rose Show, The Today Show, Dateline NBC, 20/20, 48 Hours, and most other national news programs. In 2001 and 2002,

== Books ==
Aronne's first book, Weigh Less Live Longer, from John Wiley & Sons, Inc., was published in 1996. His second book, The Skinny on Losing Weight Without Being Hungry, from Broadway-Random House, published in March 2009, is a NY Times best-seller.

== Honors ==
Aronne has won several awards for teaching, including the Leo M. Davidoff Society Prize from Albert Einstein College of Medicine in 1983 and the Eliot Hochstein Teaching Award from Cornell University in 1990. He was awarded the 2015 Atkinson-Stern Award for Distinguished Public Service by The Obesity Society and the 2013 Distinguished Achievement Award by Poly Prep Country Day School. Aronne has been a faculty member of the Alpha Omega Alpha medical honor society since 1990. He has been regularly ranked in Castle Connolly's and New York Magazine's Best Doctors in New York as a specialist in obesity and internal medicine.

== Personal life ==
Aronne is married with two children.
