= Jacquie =

Jacquie may refer to any of these people:

- Jacquie Armstrong, Canadian curler
- Jacquie Beltrao, British sports journalist and presenter
- Jacquie de Creed (died 2011), English stunt woman
- Jacquie Durrell, first wife of Gerald Durrell
- Jacquie Jordan, U.S. film and television producer
- Jacquie Lee, aka Jacquie, U.S. singer
- Jacquie Lyn (1928-2002), British born American child actress
- Jacquie O'Neill, English illustrator
- Jacquie O'Sullivan, English singer and songwriter
- Jacquie Perrin, Canadian journalist
- Jacquie Petrusma, Australian politician
- Jacquie Phelan, U.S. cyclist
- Jacquie Sturm (1927–2009), New Zealand writer
