= Eric Ravussin =

Eric Ravussin is a professor of human physiology and the director of the Nutritional Obesity Research Center at Pennington Biomedical Research Center in Baton Rouge, Louisiana. He is also the Douglas L. Gordon Chair in Diabetes and Metabolism at the center. Since 2012 he has also been a Boyd Professor at Louisiana State University.

Ravussin is a prominent obesity and exercise researcher and is internationally recognized for his work in obesity and diabetes. His research focuses on the genetic and molecular basis of obesity, as well as the "relationship between physiology and gene expression in response to diet and physical training."

In 2010, Ravussin was the recipient of the Willendorf Award from the International Association for the Study of Obesity, which is given every four years at the society's International Congress on Obesity. He was the editor-in-chief of the journal Obesity.

== Education ==
Ravussin received his Ph.D. in human physiology from the University of Lausanne in Lausanne, Switzerland in 1980. In the United States, he was a visiting assistant professor in the Department of Medicine at the University of Vermont. In 2000, he joined the faculty at Pennington Biomedical Research Center.
