= Mildred Gordon (biologist) =

American microbiologist

Mildred Kobrin Gordon
- Died: August 23, 1993 (aged 72–73)
- Scientific career
- Fields: Cell biology

Mildred Kobrin Gordon (1920 – 23 August 1993) was an American cell biologist, born in Manhattan, noted for her research of human sperm and the endometrium, and of the uterus. Gordon graduated from City College with B.S. in biology. She received an M.S. in zoology from Tulane University and her Ph.D. in anatomy from Yale University School of Medicine.

== Professional life ==
After graduating, Gordon taught and researched at Yale. In the 70's, she became an associate professor of anatomy at State University of New York. From 1981 until her death on August 23, 1993, Gordon was a professorial lecturer of biology and anatomy at Mount Sinai School of Medicine in New York. She was a professor at School for Biomedical Education of City University Medical School (now CUNY School of Medicine) for the last 13 years of her working life. Her work assisted in the development of in vitro fertilization (IVF). She also receives credit for what is known about how calcium influences the spermocyte.

== Works ==
- Gordon, Mildred (July 1973). "Localization of phosphatase activity on the membranes of the mammalian sperm head". The Journal of Experimental Zoology. 185 (1): 111–20. Bibcode:1973JEZ...185..111G. doi:10.1002/jez.1401850111. PMID 4352199.
- Gordon, Mildred; Barrnett, R.J. (October 1967). "Fine structural cytochemical localizations of phosphatase activities of rat and guinea pig". Experimental Cell Research. 48 (2): 395–412. doi:10.1016/0014-4827(67)90363-1. PMID 4295487.
- Gordon, Mildred K.; Bench, Klaus G.; Deanin, Grace G.; Gordon, Malcolm W. (10 February 1968). "Histochemical and biochemical study of synaptic lysosomes". Nature. 217 (5128): 523–7. Bibcode:1968Natur.217..523G. doi:10.1038/217523a0. PMID 5641103. S2CID 31368933.
- Gordon, Mildred; Dandekar, P.V.; Bartoszewicz, W (January 1974). "Ultrastructural localization of surface receptors for concanavalin A on rabbit spermatozoa". Journal of Reproduction and Fertility. 36 (1): 211–4. doi:10.1530/jrf.0.0360211. PMID 4809701.
- Gordon, Mildred (1975). "Cyclic changes in the fine structure of the epithelial cells of human endometrium". International Review of Cytology. 42: 127–72. doi:10.1016/s0074-7696(08)60980-8. ISBN 9780123643421. PMID 172466.
- Gordon, Mildred; Kohorn, Ernest I.; Rice, Susan I.; Hemperly, Susan (February 1972). "The relation of the structure of progestational steroids to nuclear differentiation in human endometrium". The Journal of Clinical Endocrinology and Metabolism. 34 (2): 257–264. doi:10.1210/jcem-34-2-257.
- Gordon, Mildred; Morris, Eugene; Young, Ronald J. (January 1983) "The localization of Ca2+-ATPase and Ca2+ binding proteins in the flagellum of guinea pig sperm" Molecular Reproduction & Development 8 (1); 49-55. doi: https://doi.org/10.1002/mrd.1120080106
