= Mildred Gordon =

Mildred Gordon may refer to:

- Mildred Gordon (politician) (1923–2016), British Labour Party Member of Parliament
- Mildred Gordon (writer) (1912–1979), American crime fiction novelist
- Mildred Gordon (Ganas) (1922–2015), founder of Ganas community, FFL, GROW
- Mildred Gordon (biologist) (1920–1993), American microbiologist
