= Júlia Volaufová =

Slovak statistician

Júlia Volaufová is a Slovak biostatistician whose research has applied statistics to questions involving food intake, dietary supplements, calorie restriction, body weight, and diabetes. Her more theoretical interests include mixed linear models, regression analysis, and statistical hypothesis testing. She is a professor emerita of biostatistics at the LSU Health Sciences Center New Orleans.

== Education and career ==
Volaufová studied probability and mathematical statistics at Comenius University in Bratislava, earning the equivalent of a master's degree in 1974, a rerum naturalis doctor degree in 1975, and a candidate degree (equivalent to a PhD) in 1984, under the supervision of Lubomír Kubáček.

She became a researcher in the Institute of Measurement Science of the Slovak Academy of Sciences in 1974, one of "the first generation of scholars in statistics" in Czechoslovakia, and known for her organization of seminars and meetings in the country. Eventually, she became head of the Department of Theoretical Methods in the institute. With Kubáček and Ludmila Kubáčková, she coauthored the book Statistical Models with Linear Structures (Slovak Academy of Sciences, 1995).

After visiting Louisiana State University beginning in 1994, she took a position as associate research professor in the Pennington Biomedical Research Center in 1997, and was promoted to full research professor in 2002. In 2004 she moved to the LSU Health Sciences Center New Orleans as professor of biostatistics, maintaining an adjunct affiliation with the Pennington Biomedical Research Center.

== Recognition ==
Volaufová was named a Fellow of the American Statistical Association in 2011, recognizing "her excellence in the application of statistics and collaboration on research in biomedical fields; solicitous and challenging training of graduate students and professionals; organization of multiple international conferences; and persistent, effective efforts to preserve and promote the statistics community in the former Czechoslovakia and Central Europe".
