= Jeffrey Blaustein =

American academic

Jeffrey Blaustein is a retired professor and the former head of the Behavioral Neuroscience Division at the University of Massachusetts Amherst (UMass Amherst), known for his research in behavioral neuroendocrinology. Before the Behavioral Neuroscience Division, he had served at UMass Amherst as the founding director of the Center for Neuroendocrine Studies and as the head of the Biopsychology department. He was named a National Institute of Mental Health Senior Scientist in 1997 and an American Association for the Advancement of Science fellow in 2014. He has served as the president of the Society for Behavioral Neuroendocrinology and as the editor-in-chief of the journal Endocrinology.

Blaustein has published several highly cited papers in journals such as Endocrinology, Science, Brain Research, Physiology & Behavior, and the American Journal of Physiology. His research has focused on the cellular processes behind how brain function and behavior are modified by steroid hormones, and his papers have covered topics such sex differences in the brain, the effects of hormones on rodent brains and behavior, and the effects of steroid hormones on social behavior.

Blaustein lives in Amherst, Massachusetts, where he has served as an elected Town Meeting representative.
