= BREADA =

Non-profit organization based in Louisiana, USA

- Type: Non-Profit
- Founded: 1996 in Baton Rouge, Louisiana
- Founder: Chris Campany
- Headquarters: 501 Main Street; Baton Rouge, LA 70801
- Key people: Copper Alvarez (Executive Director)
- Website: breada.org

The Big River Economic and Agricultural Development Alliance, most commonly referred to as BREADA, is a non-profit organization with headquarters in Baton Rouge, Louisiana. BREADA is the parent organization of the Red Stick Farmers Market and the Main Street Market.

== Mission ==
The organization's mission is based in aiding local production and development of food. They promote sustainability of local, family-owned farmers, fishers, and other food producers. They aim to bridge the gap between land and community through public markets.

== History ==
BREADA was founded in June 1996. Christ Campany, then a master's student in landscape architecture, directed the opening of the first market in November 1996. After Campany left the organization, Andrew Smiley became the director. Smiley served with the organization until 2003, when Copper Alvarez was hired as executive director. She is currently the executive director of BREADA.

== Red Stick Farmers Market ==
Founded in November 1996, the Red Stick Farmers Market is one of the two organizations under BREADA. The Red Stick Farmers Market is one of the largest in the state of Louisiana, with an estimated 710,000 visitors in 2011 between the three locations and the Main Street Market. There are as many as 50 vendors that sell goods at the market during the peak months of June and October. The market creates a direct link between the farmer and the consumer and provides a sustainable source of income for small Louisiana agribusinesses. The Red Stick Farmers Market is producers-only, meaning that anything the farmer brings in, they must be growing in Louisiana. Vendors pay annual dues and a weekly rental fee for their spaces. The dues cover 45 to 50 percent of the markets’ expenses. Fundraisers and grants cover the rest of the money for operation of the market.

Each week, food and product lists for the weekend's market can be found both on the Red Stick Farmers Market website and on The Advocate's website. The Advocate also features the market food and product listings the Food section the first Thursday of each month. Each Saturday market has a cooking demonstration, the topic of which is listed on The Advocate website.

In 2010, the all three market locations added the technology to use debit or electronic benefit cards. After selecting a designated amount, customers swipe their cards and receive wooden tokens in $5 increments.

The farmers elects a Red Stick Farmers Market Advisory Committee once a year. The role of the committee is to advise the board of directors and recommend decisions on new applicants. One member of the committee sits on the board of directors.

=== Locations ===
From its founding in 1996 until 2002, the Saturday Red Stick Farmers Market was located on a surface lot at St. Louis Street and North Boulevard in Baton Rouge, Louisiana. In 2002, the market relocated to the 5th street side of the Main Street Market in downtown Baton Rouge.

Mid-week locations include a Tuesday morning market at the Unitarian Church on Goodwood Boulevard and a Thursday location on the grounds of Pennington Biomedical Research Center, both in Baton Rouge.

== Main Street Market ==
The Main Street Market first opened in November 2002 as a result of the 1996 Plan Baton Rouge project, a plan to revitalize downtown Baton Rouge. The market is open six days a week and has permanent vendors that include one retailer and seven dining establishments. On Saturday, when the Red Stick Farmers Market is open next door, more than one dozen more mobile vendors set up inside the Main Street Market area. The Lamar Community Kitchen, one of the permanent vendors, hosts live cooking demonstrations featuring local celebrity chefs.

=== Location ===
The Main Street Market is located on the first level of the Galvez parking garage at the corner of Main Street and 5th Avenue in downtown Baton Rouge.

=== Redesign Collaboration ===
BREADA has begun collaboration with Commercial Design Interiors Group and a group of students from Louisiana State University's College of Art and Design to redesign the Main Street Market. The market is a part of the Galvez parking garage, and was not originally designed for the way the public uses the market, and has endured significant wear and tear over the years. Funding for the redesign will come from BREADA and the Office of State Buildings (OSB). The OSB will also oversee the project.

The redesign will center on a map of the Mississippi River from an 1800s map. Changes include more bathrooms, changes in the seating arrangements, and using rope lines to create back-and-forth lines in front of the vendors. Vendors will be located on the east side of the market area and have fronts that look like crates. Portable kiosks will be located on the west side of the market and look like carts. The goal of the portable kiosks is conserve space and create flexibility.

== Mobile Market ==
In September 2012, Kip Holden, Mayor-President of Baton Rouge, created community programs with the goal of making Baton Rouge a healthier city. The Mobile Market is a food truck that will visit neighborhoods in north Baton Rouge that have been declared "food deserts" by the U.S. Department of Agriculture. These neighborhoods are in the 70802, 70805, and 70807 ZIP codes. The truck will visit the neighborhoods each week, selling produce from small-farm farmers, to give residents greater access to fresh produce. The Mobile Market will feature cooking demonstrations and other educational events. The Mobile Market project is expected to begin in February 2013.

== Nutrition Assistance Programs ==
The ability to accept Nutrition Assistance Program benefits was added in 2010. All three locations of the Red Stick Farmers Market and the Main Street Market accept benefits from Supplemental Nutrition Assistance Program (SNAP), Woman, Infants, and Children (WIC), and Senior Farmers Market Nutrition Program (SFMNP). All benefits are accessed by an Electronic Benefits Transfer (EBT) card, which looks and operates like a debit card. At all locations, patrons may take their EBT cards to the debit and credit card terminal to have their cards swiped in exchange for tokens worth $5 each. Tokens can be used at any vendor booth. SNAP customers receive an extra $10 in tokens after shopping at the market three times.

== Buy Fresh, Buy Local ==
BREADA serves as the regional chapter affiliate of Louisiana for the Buy Fresh, Buy Local campaign. Buy Fresh, Buy Local is organized on the national level by FoodRoutes Network, a nonprofit organization. FoodRoutes Network provides communication tools, organizing support, and marketing resources to the chapter affiliates. The campaign was designed by Social Impact Studios, a national creative agency based in Philadelphia that focuses mainstream marketing practices on social issues. The goal of the campaign is to provide consumers access to fresh, locally grown food through outreach events, local food guides, and educational materials. Buy Fresh, Buy Local affiliates work to rebuild local food systems and promote sustainable agriculture. In its role as regional chapter affiliate, BREADA works with communities throughout Louisiana to rebuild local food systems.

== Disaster Relief ==
Following the landfall of Hurricane Isaac in August 2012, the Red Stick Farmer's Market collected donations for the Louisiana Small Farm Survival Fund. The fund assists farmers affected by the hurricane by providing gap funding and recovery assistance to farmers who experienced crop loss or equipment or structural damage.
