= Discover Oncology =

- Discipline: Endocrinology, Oncology
- Language: English
- Edited by: Carol A. Lange

Publication details
- Former name(s): Hormones and Cancer
- History: 2010–present
- Publisher: Springer-Verlag on behalf of The Endocrine Society
- Frequency: Bimonthly

Standard abbreviations
- ISO 4: Discov. Oncol.

Indexing
- CODEN: HCOABS
- ISSN: 1868-8497 (print); 1868-8500 (web)
- LCCN: 2010205356
- OCLC no.: 607885106

Links
- Journal homepage; Online archive

Discover Oncology, formerly Hormones and Cancer, is a bimonthly peer-reviewed medical journal covering research on all aspects of hormone action on cancer. It was established in 2010 and is published by Springer Science + Business Media on behalf of The Endocrine Society. The editor-in-chief is Carol A. Lange (University of Minnesota).

== Abstracting and indexing ==
The journal is abstracted and indexed in:

- PubMed/MEDLINE
- Scopus
- EMBASE
- Chemical Abstracts Service
- Academic OneFile
- Biological Abstracts
- BIOSIS Previews
