= Endocrine Reviews =

- Discipline: Endocrinology
- Language: English
- Edited by: Leonard Wartofsky

Publication details
- Frequency: Bimonthly
- Impact factor: 22 (2023)

Standard abbreviations
- ISO 4: Endocr. Rev.

Indexing
- ISSN: 0163-769X (print); 1945-7189 (web)

Links
- Journal homepage

Endocrine Reviews is a bimonthly peer-reviewed academic journal for review articles in endocrinology published by the Endocrine Society. The current editor-in-chief is Ashley Grossman, MD. Its 2023 impact factor is 22.

Endocrine Reviews publishes authoritative review articles spanning experimental and clinical endocrinology. The Editors of Endocrine Reviews consider topics on emerging and established clinical research as well as advances in endocrine science emanating from studies of cell biology, immunology, pharmacology, genetics, molecular biology, neuroscience, reproductive medicine, and pediatric endocrinology.
