= George Andrew Hobson =

British civil engineer (1854–1917)

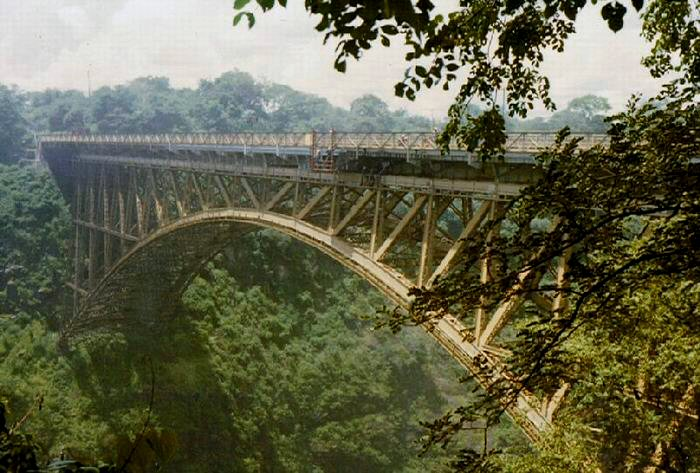
Victoria Falls Bridge

George Andrew Hobson (29 March 1854 – 25 January 1917) was a British civil engineer known for the development of the patented Hobson steel flooring and the design of the Victoria Falls Bridge.

He was born in Leeds, Yorkshire and educated at King James's School, Knaresborough and Watt Institution in Edinburgh. From 1871 he was an apprentice with Messrs Hopkins, Gilkes and Co., locomotive builders in Middlesbrough, then in Yorkshire. He then worked for the Teesside Bridge and Engineering Company (later part of Dorman Long) for several years.

In 1880, Hobson became the Chief Assistant to Sir Charles Fox of Sir Charles Fox & Sons (later Freeman Fox & Partners; now part of Hyder Consulting). He was involved in projects such as the Mersey Tunnel, the Liverpool Overhead Railway, and the extension of the Great Central Railway to London. He designed and patented a new type of steel bridge deck for the railway, known as Hobson’s Steel Flooring. An example of this can be found at the Empress Road bridge, which crosses the historic Great Central Railway in Loughborough. In partnership with Edmund Wragge, Hobson was awarded a Telford Medal in 1900 for their paper on the Metropolitan Terminus of the Great Central Railway. He became a partner in the firm in 1901.

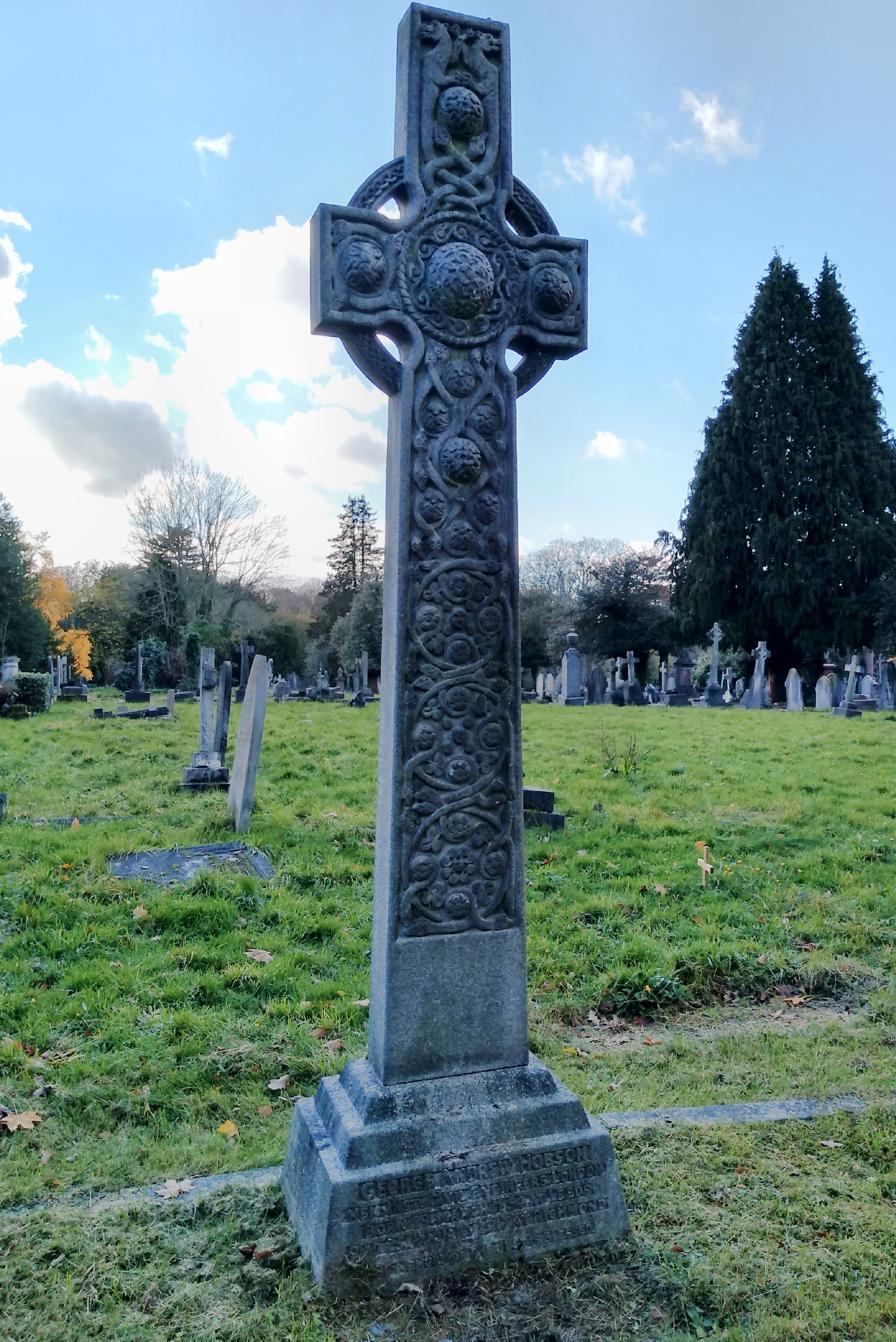
Richmond Cemetery, George Andrew Hobson memorial

His chief work thereafter was the construction of railways in Africa and South America, of which his most notable achievement was the design of the Victoria Falls Bridge. On this project, he was assisted in the stress calculations by Ralph Freeman, who went on to design the Sydney Harbour Bridge. The location of the railway bridge was chosen by Cecil Rhodes to give rail passengers a clear view of the falls and presented a number of engineering challenges such as the need for a design and construction technique which avoided the use of scaffolding and the need for the structure to be spray resistant. The final solution was the 150 metre trussed steel arch which stands today. He was awarded the George Stephenson Gold Medal by the Institute of Civil Engineers for his account of the design and construction of the bridge.

He died in Richmond, Surrey in 1917 and was buried in Richmond Cemetery. He had married Annie Jean, the daughter of Thomas Addyman of Harrogate and had an only daughter.
