= John Desmond =

American architect (1922–2008)

- Born: John Jacob Desmond; April 5, 1922; Denver, Colorado, U.S.
- Died: March 27, 2008 (aged 85); Zachary, Louisiana, U.S.
- Education: Jesuit High School; Tulane University; Massachusetts Institute of Technology
- Occupation: Architect

John Jacob Desmond (April 5, 1922, in Denver, Colorado – March 27, 2008, in Zachary, Louisiana) was an American architect from Hammond and Baton Rouge, Louisiana.

== Early life ==
John Desmond was the third child of Timothy Joseph Desmond (Cork City, Ireland) and Rose Isabelle Dvorak Desmond. After living for some time in New York, the family moved to New Orleans, Louisiana, where Desmond graduated from Jesuit High School. After moving with his family to Hammond, Louisiana, he became a recipient of a legislative scholarship for his first year at Tulane University. By working in the cafeteria he was able to complete a bachelor's degree in architecture. He subsequently received a master's of Architecture from the Massachusetts Institute of Technology, where he studied under William Wurster and Alvar Aalto. He was a Second Lieutenant in the United States Navy during World War II aboard the destroyer U.S.S. Madison in the Pacific theater and also saw action at the Battle of Anzio.

== Career ==
After returning from WWII but before practicing architecture in Hammond, Desmond worked for Skidmore Owings & Merrill, in New York City; A. Hays Town in Baton Rouge; and the Tennessee Valley Authority, in Knoxville.

Some of the buildings he designed include the Southeastern Louisiana University cafeteria in Hammond, St. Albert the Great Chapel & Student Center, LSU Union, the Louisiana State Library, the Cane's River Center (originally named the Riverside Centroplex and later the Baton Rouge River Center), the Pennington Bio-Medical Research Center, the Fifth Circuit Court of Appeals, the Louisiana State Archives, the Louisiana Naval Museum as well as his own residence, all in Baton Rouge. With François Emilio (Milo) Puiz, art director, he realized the second remodeling of the interior of St. Joseph Cathedral according to the directives of Vatican Council II. In New Orleans, he designed the Rogers Memorial Chapel, as well as the Lindy Boggs Center, both on the campus of his alma mater Tulane University.
