= American Association of Clinical Endocrinology =

Professional community of physicians

- Founded: 1991
- Purpose: Medicine; Endocrinology; Diabetes; Thyroid; Obesity; Nutrition; Reproduction
- Location: Jacksonville, Fla., US
- Key people: Susan Samson, MD, FACE – 2024 President; Johnnie White, MBA, CAE, CMP Fellow – CEO
- Website: www.aace.com

The American Association of Clinical Endocrinology (AACE) is a professional community of physicians specializing in endocrinology, diabetes, and metabolism. AACE's mission is elevating clinical endocrinology to improve global health. The association is headquartered in Jacksonville, Florida, US.

== Background ==
Prior to AACE's inception, the field of clinical endocrinology was not represented in the Health Care Financing Administration (HCFA), health policymaking bodies and many of the professional physician societies. AACE was founded in 1991 by a national committee of 26 clinical endocrinologists to address this inequity and become the voice for the specialty. Dr. Yank Coble, Jr., the driving force and co-founder of AACE, became the inaugural President of the Association.

AACE is now the world's largest organization representing clinical endocrinologists and endocrine care teams. With more than 6,500 members in the United States and 91 other countries around the globe, the organization has developed a robust network of professional associates and political allies.

In addition to partnerships with the American Diabetes Association, American Thyroid Association and others in the United States, AACE values global ties with the International Diabetes Federation, the International Congress on Endocrinology, the European Association for the Study of Diabetes, and the Mexican Society of Nutrition and Endocrinology (SMNE).

These affiliations afford AACE the opportunity to provide its member physicians with an array of educational programs and activities and to provide their patients with quality and cost-effective care for their endocrine diseases and disorders.

== Advocacy ==
The American Medical Association House of Delegates granted delegate status to AACE in 1996. The creation of the Endocrine Section Council in 2000 allows AACE to represent endocrine interests on a large scale with some of the most instrumental medical policymakers in the world.

AACE continues to facilitate a greater understanding and urgency among members of Congress for addressing the epidemic of diabetes in the United States and promoting a focus on diabetes and other endocrine-related disorders in federal prevention and wellness activities and in chronic disease management. The AACE Board of Directors declared obesity a disease state in July 2011 and AACE was the primary sponsor of the resolution adopted by the American Medical Association House of Delegates in June 2013, officially recognizing obesity as a disease.

AACE is working with congressional sponsors in the U.S. House of Representatives and U.S. Senate in authoring and advocating for passage of the National Diabetes Clinical Care Commission Act (H.R. 1192/ S. 586). This legislation creates a Commission that will provide a mechanism for diabetes experts in the private sector to help the federal government address diabetes in an effective and fiscally responsible manner. The commission will make recommendations to Congress and to the Secretary of Health and Human Services on ways to improve the delivery and quality of diabetes care.

AACE is also working with interested stakeholders to advocate for a sustainable Medicare reimbursement for bone density scans done with a dual energy x-ray absorptiometry (DXA) machine and preserve patient access to osteoporosis testing, prevention and treatment services.

=== Obesity as a disease ===
Following a report from the AACE Task Force on Obesity and a unanimous vote of the Board of Directors, AACE declared obesity to be a disease state in 2011. The Association believed that this declaration would help pave the way for more effective therapies and treatments to curtail the rising obesity rate.

Until 2011, obesity had long been viewed as the result of poor lifestyle choices. However, sufficient evidence in hormonal and regulatory disorders and genetic components were accumulated, pushing the condition into the "disease state" status. Obesity is a strong component of Type 2 diabetes – an endocrine disorder. AACE has pledged to be at the forefront of the clinical management of this disease and its life-threatening consequences.

In 2013, the American Medical Association (AMA) House of Delegates approved a resolution agreeing with AACE's position that recognized obesity as a disease.

== AACE Annual Meeting ==
AACE holds an annual scientific and clinical congress each year in different locations across the United States. This large gathering of member physicians from around the world provides a comprehensive range of Continuing Medical Education (CME) sessions, abstract poster tours, product theaters and area-expert presentations.

== The American College of Endocrinology (ACE) ==
Created in 1993, the American College of Endocrinology (ACE) is the educational, scientific and charitable branch of AACE. ACE provides professional education and continuing medical education (CME) with the objective of promoting the translation of scientific advances into clinical practice. ACE programs include the Endocrine Certification in Neck Ultrasound (ECNU) program and the ACE Self-Assessment Program (ASAP).

== Continuing Medical Education (CME) ==
The purpose of Continuing Medical Education (CME) is to improve the efficiency and quality of health care to patients through the most up-to-date physician education resources that help to fulfill the mission, goals and objectives of the Association. The AACE CME department is fully accredited by the Accreditation Council for Continuing Medical Education (ACCME) to provide AMA PRA Category 1 Credit(s) for physicians.

=== Endocrine Certification in Neck Ultrasound (ECNU) ===
Endocrine Certification in Neck Ultrasound (ECNU) is a professional certification in the field of neck ultrasonography for physicians who perform consultations and diagnostic evaluations for thyroid and parathyroid disorders. It is created and administered by the American College of Endocrinology and is recognized by the American Institute of Ultrasound in Medicine (AIUM), one of the preeminent, national accreditation bodies for ultrasound practices. ACE provides CME courses that assist physicians seeking to earn ECNU distinction.

=== ACE Self-Assessment Program (ASAP) ===
The ACE Self-Assessment Program (ASAP) is a continuing medical educational (CME) program that provides a full curriculum with up-to-date information about the evaluation, diagnosis, treatment and management of endocrine system diseases. ASAP assists endocrinologists in preparation and maintenance of their sub-specialty certification.

== Patient education programs ==
In addition to continuing educational programs for its members and other related health care professionals, AACE conducts a number of patient education programs, including: Thyroid Awareness, My Diabetes Emergency Plan, Prescription Help, and the Lowdown on Low Blood Sugar.

=== Thyroid awareness ===
For more than two decades ACE has raised public awareness of the importance of good thyroid health using multiple message themes and distribution channels including television print and web news interviews, public service announcements, health fair interaction, and the introduction of the blue paisley ribbon as the iconic symbol for thyroid awareness. In 2020, AACE launched a new "Up To Here" thyroid awareness campaign and website, featuring updated creative and materials to help educate patients and public on thyroid diseases and conditions.

=== My Diabetes Emergency Plan ===
Created following Hurricanes Katrina and Rita in 2005 by the American College of Endocrinology (ACE) with support provided from Lilly Diabetes, the My Diabetes Emergency Plan is a comprehensive resource for diabetes patients in crises. The plan has three components: A pocket-sized checklist, an instructional "how-to" video and an educational website. Available in English and Spanish, the checklist details for diabetes patients the essential items and the practical steps to take in advance of an emergency situation - before they are faced with a difficult situation.

== Publications ==
- Endocrine Practice – The Journal of the American Association of Clinical Endocrinologists
- AACE Clinical Case Reports – AACE's open access journal for clinical case reports, visual vignettes, video vignettes, and more.

== Sister organizations ==
- American Association of Endocrine Surgeons (AAES)
- American Diabetes Association (ADA)
- American Society for Bone & Mineral Research (ASBMR)
- American Society of Andrology (ASA)
- American Society of Endocrine Physician Assistants (ASEPA)
- American Society for Reproductive Medicine (ASRM)
- American Thyroid Association (ATA)
- Androgen Excess and PCOS Society (AE-PCOS)
- Asia & Oceania Thyroid Association
- Association of Program Directors in Endocrinology (APDEM)
- Endocrine Nurses Society (ENS)
- Endocrine Society (ES)
- European Congress of Endocrinology
- European Thyroid Association (ETA)
- International Society for Clinical Densitometry (ISCD)
- Juvenile Diabetes Research Foundation (JDRF)
- Latin American Thyroid Society
- Pediatric Endocrine Society (PES)
- Pediatric Endocrinology Nursing Society (PENS)
- Society for Behavioral Neuroendocrinology (SBN)
- Society for Gynecologic Investigation (SGI)
- Society for the Study of Reproduction (SSR)
- The Obesity Society (TOS)
- The Pituitary Society (PS)
- Thyroid Federation International (TFI)
