= Endocrine Society =

American medical society

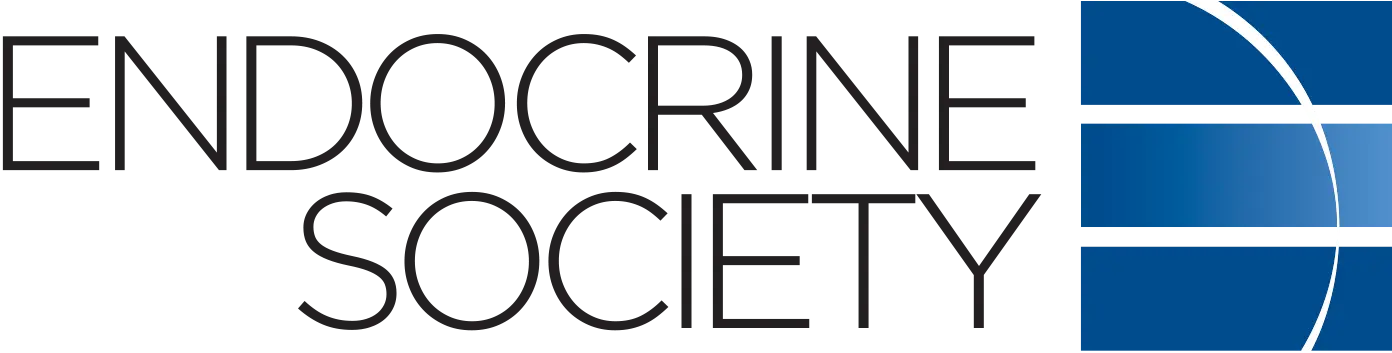
- Founded: 1916; 110 years ago
- Tax ID no.: 73-0531256
- Legal status: 501(c)(3) nonprofit organization
- Headquarters: Washington, D.C., US
- Coordinates: 38.90387°N 77.04617°W
- Region served: Worldwide
- Fields: Endocrinology
- Members: 18,000 (2025)
- Website: www.endocrine.org
- Formerly called: Association for the Study of Internal Secretions

The Endocrine Society is a professional, international medical organization in the field of endocrinology and metabolism, founded in 1916 as the Association for the Study of Internal Secretions. The official name of the organization was changed to the Endocrine Society on January 1, 1952. It is a leading organization in the field and publishes four leading journals. In addition, it regularly publishes medical guidelines on topics in the field of endocrinology. It has more than 18,000 members from over 120 countries in medicine, molecular and cellular biology, biochemistry, physiology, genetics, immunology, education, and allied health. The Society's mission is: "to advance excellence in endocrinology and promote its essential and integrative role in scientific discovery, medical practice, and human health."

Annual meetings have been held since 1916 except in 1943 and 1945 during World War II when meetings were cancelled at the request of the United States government. Realizing the increasing importance of endocrinology to general medicine, the Council, in 1947, established an annual postgraduate assembly now known as the Clinical Endocrinology Update.

The Society publishes Endocrinology, the first issue of which was published in January 1927 and edited by Henry Harrower. Another publication, The Journal of Clinical Endocrinology (JCEM), was established in 1941, and the name of the journal was changed to The Journal of Clinical Endocrinology & Metabolism on January 1, 1952. Current publications include: Endocrine Reviews, JCEM Case Reports, and Journal of the Endocrine Society (JES).

== Annual meetings ==
Each year, the Endocrine Society hosts three major meetings throughout the course of a calendar year: ENDO, Clinical Endocrinology Update (CEU), and Endocrine Board Review (EBR). ENDO is a scientific meeting on endocrinology research and clinical care. CEU provides practicing endocrinologists with the latest updates through the latest expert guidelines in hormone care. EBR is an online training program for fellows, residents, and physicians preparing for board certification exams. EBR offers a comprehensive preparation course for the Endocrinology, Diabetes, & Metabolism Exam.

== Advocacy ==
The Endocrine Society influences a wide range of policies affecting endocrine-related research and practice.

The organization’s priorities include: increased funding for the National Institutes of Health (NIH); ensuring access to adequate, affordable healthcare; improved regulation of endocrine-disrupting chemicals (EDCs) in the United States and internationally, realigning physician payment to recognize the value endocrinologists bring to the health care system; reduction in the prevalence of diabetes and obesity, protecting access to care for women and transgender patients; improved research policy; and increased awareness of the impact of climate change on endocrine health.

Insulin affordability has become an increasingly prevalent issue for people living with diabetes. The Endocrine Society's advocacy team supports insulin affordability for all; the Endocrine Society advocates for the Inflation Reduction Act to limit cost-sharing to a copay of no more than $35 and cap costs at no more than $100 per month.

Additionally, the Endocrine Society has partnered with IPEN to raise awareness of health risks associated with endocrine-disrupting chemicals. Experts in the field have developed a guide for public interest organization and policy makers urging them to prioritize specific actions on EDCs, including a coherent identification process linked to control measures to reduce widespread exposures.

In 2023, Delia M. Sosa and other members of the American Medical Association’s Medical Student Section authored a resolution with the Endocrine Society that led to the American Medical Association strengthening its position on protecting gender-affirming care. This resolution advocated against legislation criminalizing access to gender-affirming healthcare and supported efforts to oppose discriminatory policies.

== Science in the news ==
The Endocrine Society and its membership have developed and showcased new research in a swath of topical areas that has garnered media attention for its clinical significance. In 2019, clinical practice guidelines addressing Treatment of Diabetes in Older Adults. These guidelines recommendations included higher glucose and A1c targets for older people with diabetes, particularly those with several other chronic illnesses and cognitive impairment.

A 2021 study found that eating breakfast earlier in the morning, before 8:30 AM, can potentially reduce the risk of type 2 diabetes. The Endocrine Society publicized this study, looking at eight years of data on 10,575 adults, at ENDO.

During the COVID-19 pandemic, one study published in Endocrine Society Journals suggested that vitamin D helped reduce the effects of COVID.

Endocrine Society members unveiled research about the promise of male birth control pills This new contraception proved safe in the testing phases.

An ENDO 2023 study examined that obesity vastly underestimated the prevalence of obesity using BMI, and many people with normal BMI still have obesity.

In 2023, the Endocrine Society released a scientific statement on aging. This statement offered data and available therapies for older individuals with growth hormone, adrenal, ovarian, testicular, thyroid, osteoporosis, vitamin D deficiency, type 2 diabetes, and water metabolism.

== Sister societies ==
The Endocrine Society hosts a forum for other related societies to discuss, interact, and share views in the field of endocrinology. The list of related societies is as follows:

- American Association of Clinical Endocrinologists (AACE)
- American Association of Endocrine Surgeons
- American Diabetes Association
- American Society for Bone & Mineral Research
- American Society for Reproductive Medicine
- American Society of Andrology
- American Society of Endocrine Physician Assistants
- American Thyroid Association
- Androgen Excess and PCOS Society
- Association for Program Directors in Endocrinology, Diabetes and Metabolism
- Endocrine Nurses Society
- International Society for Clinical Densitometry
- Pediatric Endocrine Society
- Pediatric Endocrinology Nursing Society
- Society for Behavioral Neuroendocrinology
- Society for Gynecologic Investigation
- Society for the Study of Reproduction
- The Association of Program Directors in Endocrinology, Diabetes and Metabolism
- The Obesity Society
- The Pituitary Society

== Publications ==
The Endocrine Society publishes the following journals:

- Journal of the Endocrine Society
- Endocrine Reviews
- Endocrinology
- The Journal of Clinical Endocrinology & Metabolism
- JCEM Case Reports
