= American Association of Endocrine Surgeons =

The American Association of Endocrine Surgeons (AAES) is a professional organization for endocrine surgeons. The organization partakes in patient care, education, and scientific investigations in the field of endocrine surgery, including training endocrine surgeons and developing practice guidelines.

== Background, mission, and annual meeting ==
Deriving inspiration from the formation of the International Association of Endocrine Surgeons (IAES), the AAES was created in 1979 by Orlo Clark, Tony Edis, Edward Kaplan, Jack Monchik, and Norman Thompson during the San Francisco Congress of International Society of Surgeons. The goal of the organization was to enhance education, clinical care, and research in endocrine surgery and recruit membership from surgeons who had made significant contributions to the field. On May 5–6, 1980, the first meeting of the AAES was held in Ann Arbor, Michigan, and subsequent meetings have been held every year in the spring. Today, the meeting program consists of competitive oral/poster presentations, invited lectureships (including the Orlo and Carol Clark Distinguished Lecturer in Endocrine Surgery), interesting case presentations, workshops, awarding grants, and electing leadership. As an organization, the AAES has expanded its membership and programs to include postgraduate courses, research awards, quality and outcomes tracking, and comprehensive endocrine surgery fellowships.

== Membership and leadership ==
Currently, the organization has more than 600 members practicing in over 40 states and 30 countries. Membership requirements include certification by the American Board of Surgery (or its equivalent in Canada, Central America, Mexico, and South America), initiation as a Fellow of the American College of Surgeons (or an international equivalent), and participation in clinical and educational activities related to endocrine surgery. There are also membership categories for international surgeons and allied specialists dedicated to endocrine surgery.

== Noteworthy accomplishments and contributions ==
Since its founding, the AAES has acknowledged and promoted endocrine surgeon-scientists through awards and grants. These include the Oliver Cope Meritorious Achievement Award (first awarded to Oliver Cope in 1985), the Paul LoGerfo Research Award (first awarded to Rebecca Sippel in 2010), and the ThyCa Award for Thyroid Cancer Research (first awarded to Melissa Wilson in 2017). In partnership with the American Association of Clinical Endocrinologists, the AAES released clinical practice guidelines for thyroid cancer in 2001, a position statement for the management of primary hyperparathyroidism in 2005, and management guidelines for adrenal incidentalomas in 2009. In 2010, Janice Pasieka led the construction of the first endocrine surgery patient education website. That same year, Dr. Martha Zeiger established the first Endocrine Surgery University, an annual postgraduate course in routine and complex cases in endocrine surgery. In 2012, William Inabnet III developed the Collaborative Endocrine Surgery Quality Improvement Program (CESQIP), the first multi-institutional database devoted to quality improvement and outcomes in endocrine surgery. Under the direction of Sally Carty, the AAES published the first practice guidelines for parathyroidectomy in 2016. In community practices, recognition of endocrine surgery is growing and the AAES established the Community-Based Surgeons Committee in 2014 to represent this population of the membership. In general, the AAES has been acknowledged for the proportion of women surgeons represented in membership and as leaders. Approximately half of endocrine surgery fellowship graduates are women and, currently, more than 35% of active members are women.

== Endocrine surgery fellowships ==
The AAES membership and leadership are responsible for the development and governance of all comprehensive endocrine surgery fellowships in North America. Many early members of the AAES had gained additional exposure and experience with endocrine surgery via apprenticeships, international fellowships, or surgical oncology fellowships. Recognizing the importance of advanced post-graduate training in endocrine surgery, prominent members created domestic fellowships, most notably, Norman Thompson at the University of Michigan in 1984. The AAES defined a fellowship curriculum in 2004 and sponsored the first match in 2006, supervised by Allan Siperstein. In 2013, a regular accreditation process was established to ensure that all fellowship programs provide robust case volume, complexity, and diversity. As of 2019, there are twenty-three AAES fellowship training programs in comprehensive endocrine surgery. Many fellowship graduates perform a high-volume of endocrine operations early in their careers, and more than 95% experience high job satisfaction. In recent years, endocrine surgery fellowship graduates have joined both academic and community practices equally, increasing patient-access to specialized care and signifying a growing recognition of the specialty.
