= St. Albert the Great Chapel and Catholic Student Center =

- St. Albert the Great Chapel and Catholic Student Center
- 30.5095°N 90.4672°W
- Location: Hammond, Louisiana, United States
- Address: 409 W. Dakota Street, Hammond, LA 70401
- Denomination: Roman Catholic
- Website: stalbertselu.org

History
- Founder(s): Rev. Raymond Haddad, O.P. & Fr. Philip Dennis Brady, O.P.
- Dedicated: 1962

Architecture
- Architect: John Desmond
- Style: Mid-Century modern
- Construction cost: $350,000 (≈ $3.65 million in 2026 dollars)

Specifications
- Capacity: 800
- Materials: Vertical Line Brick, Dalle de verre stained glass, exterior wood slats

Administration
- Diocese: Diocese of Baton Rouge
- Deanery: Northeast Deanery

The St. Albert the Great Chapel and Catholic Student Center (commonly known as the Catholic Student Association or CSA) is a Roman Catholic campus ministry located in Hammond, Louisiana, serving students of Southeastern Louisiana University. It is operated by the Roman Catholic Diocese of Baton Rouge. Sacramental responsibilities and pastoral care in the center are provided by the Order of Preachers from the Province of St. Martin de Porres.

The chapel and student center are located across the street from Strawberry Stadium.

== History ==
The idea for a Catholic student center at Southeastern Louisiana College was proposed in 1951 by the Knights of Columbus. Funding was raised and land was acquired for the project. Fr. Dennis P. Brady, O.P. suggested the name of the chapel to Archbishop Joseph Rummel. The center was officially dedicated in February 1962 by Bishop Robert E. Tracy.

The original complex consisted of two connected buildings surrounding a central patio. One building contained the chapel, auditorium, and kitchen, while the other housed administrative offices, classrooms, and student social spaces.

The chapel is noted for its stained glass north wall and received national attention in architectural publications at the time of its construction.

The center was historically associated with the Newman Club, a Catholic student organization founded locally in 1937 by SLC faculty member A. E. Wolder, Jr.

== Notable visitors ==
Maria von Trapp lectured in the auditorium in March 1963.

Flannery O'Connor gave a lecture titled “The Catholic Novelist in the Protestant South” in November on 1962, in a letter to Fr. Edward J. Romagosa, S.J. she wrote "Fr. Haddad was very nice but there were a lot of other priests there who I am sure had never lowered themselves to read a piece of fiction in their lives and were unprepared for what I had to say."

Fr. Ross Romero, S.J. is a frequent visiting priest and professor at Kenrick-Glennon Seminary in St. Louis.

William S. Wainwright, President of Southeastern Louisiana University frequently attends mass at St. Albert's. On the morning of his inaugural investiture ceremony. Wainwright and his family attended a mass led by Father Taylor Sanford in the chapel.

== Campus ministry ==
St. Albert the Great Chapel and Catholic Student Center serves as the primary Catholic ministry for Southeastern Louisiana University. It offers Mass, confession, Eucharistic adoration, and student programming.

The center has served the university community for over 65 years.

== Catholic Student Association ==
The Catholic Student Association (CSA) is an official Southeastern student organization. Membership and participation is open to all students. CSA members also serve as liturgical ministers for daily and Sunday Masses in the chapel. Students also have access to study spaces, lounges, and community resources, making it both a spiritual and social hub on campus.

Every semester for over 13 years in the student center St Albert's holds a "Lion Awakening Retreat" for students, it is centered around the Mystical Body of Christ.

== Architectural history ==
Upon the building's completion John Desmond would win an national Award and is an example of the "new formalism" architectural style.

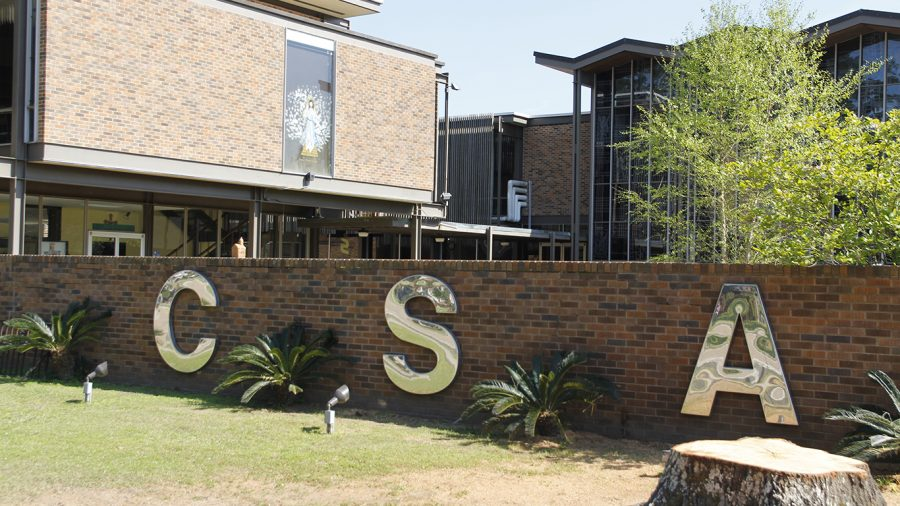
Front facade of St Albert's

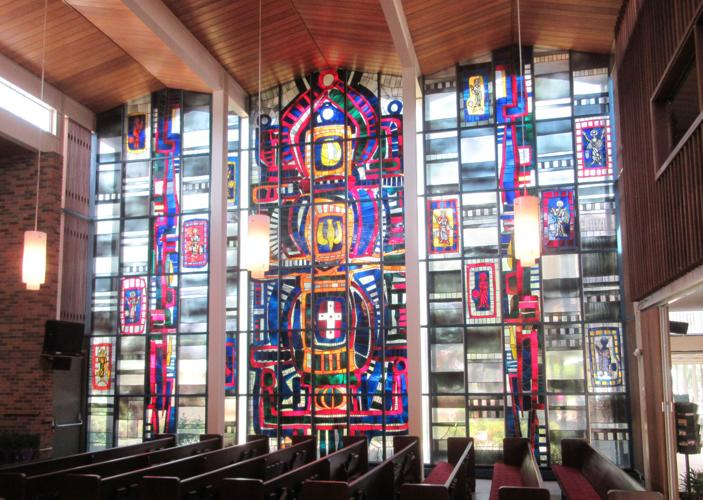
Stained glass in chapel

The auditorium of the student center holds a 7'0" x 7'6" Acrylic on Gesso painting of St. Albert by Ksenia Annis.

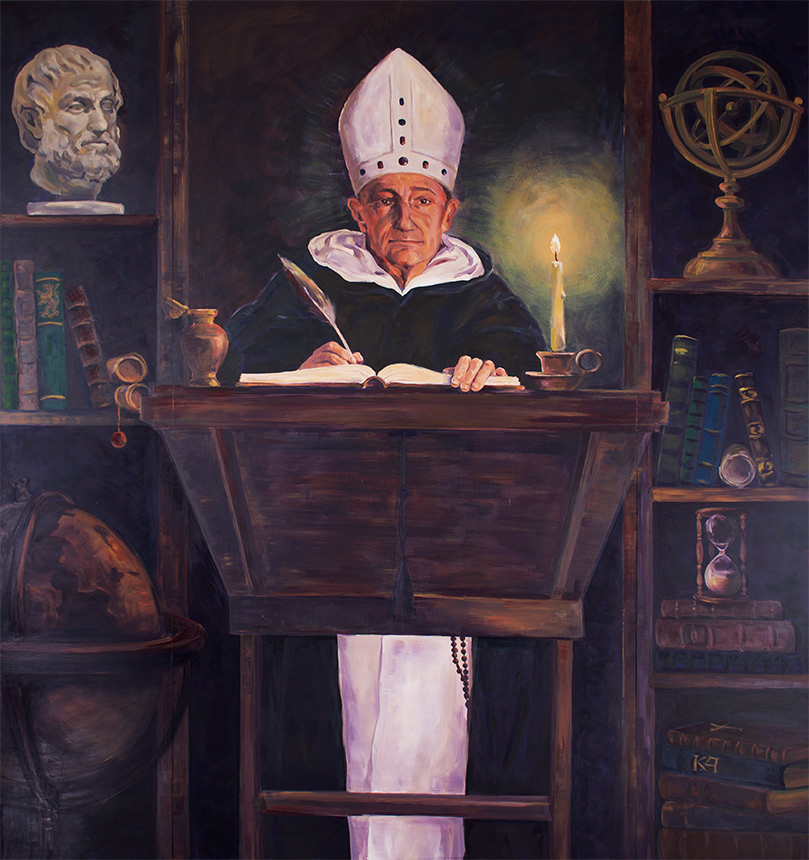
St Albert The Great by Ksenia Annis

== See also ==
- Newman Center
- Catholic campus ministry
- Retreat (spiritual)
- Church architecture
