= Jacquie O'Neill =

British illustrator

Jacquie O'Neill (born 1969 in Yorkshire, England) is an English illustrator.

Jacquie O'Neill was born in 1969 in Saltburn-by-the-Sea, Yorkshire, England, the middle of three daughters. She attended King James's School in Knaresborough, Yorkshire, and after that Harrogate College where her father was a Photography Lecturer.

After training as an Accountant she soon realised this was not the profession for her and followed many career paths including running a hotel & restaurant. After the birth of her first two daughters in 1995 & 1997 she returned to education and took an MSc in Creative Technology at Leeds Metropolitan University which she passed with distinctions. After Graduation in 2002 she moved to London and launched her illustration career.

Her first commission was for the BBC, she illustrated a map of London for the online series The Ghosts of Albion. Since then she has had a host of commissions from notable client's including: eBay, Reebok, Mattel, Warner Entertainment to name but a few.

Essentially a fashion illustrator she has branched out into the world of children's illustration completing a range of cards for girls for a company called Soul Trader UK. She illustrated Po for Nickelodeon's KungFu Panda online games and has also illustrated the US version of the Meg Cabot books in the 1-800-Where-R-You Series

Her work was selected to appear in Martin Dawber's The Big Book of Fashion Illustration which was published by Batsford Ltd 2007 ISBN 978-0-7134-9045-9

In the Summer of 2008 Jacquie was interviewed by Shivani Mair for Creative Careers Surgery which is an online resource for young people wanting to know more about career options in the creative industry.

In December 2008 she illustrated The Cheeky Girls packaging for the launch of their cosmetics and skincare range which donates a percentage of the profits to ChildLine

In March 2009 she was one of 3 Fashion illustrators asked to contemplate their influences for the Association of Illustrators Portfolios

In January 2010 the first children's book that she has illustrated will be available in the US. Sticker Stories: Figure Skating published by Grosset & Dunlap. ISBN 978-0-448-45343-9

Jacquie currently lives in Cornwall with her American husband Michael and their four daughters. She is a member of The Association of Illustrators and the Society of Children's Book Writers and Illustrators
