= Endocrine Practice =

- Discipline: Endocrinology
- Language: English
- Edited by: Derek LeRoith

Publication details
- History: 1995; 30 years ago to present
- Publisher: AACECORP
- Frequency: Bimonthly
- Impact factor: 3.805 (2017)

Standard abbreviations
- ISO 4: Endocr. Pract.

Indexing
- CODEN: EPNRAT
- ISSN: 1530-891X (print); 1934-2403 (web)
- OCLC no.: 35074613

Links
- Journal homepage; Online access

Endocrine Practice is a bimonthly peer-reviewed medical journal covering endocrinology. It was established in 1995, and is the official journal of the American Association of Clinical Endocrinologists (AACE) and the American College of Endocrinology (ACE). It is published by AACECOR, Inc., a subsidiary of the AACE and ACE, and the editor-in-chief is Derek LeRoith (Icahn School of Medicine at Mount Sinai). According to the Journal Citation Reports, the journal has a 2017 impact factor of 3.805.
