= Obesity (journal) =

- Discipline: Endocrinology
- Language: English
- Edited by: Eric Ravussin

Publication details
- Former name: Obesity Research
- History: 1993–present
- Publisher: Wiley-Blackwell on behalf of The Obesity Society
- Frequency: Monthly
- Impact factor: 5.002 (2020)

Standard abbreviations
- ISO 4: Obesity
- NLM: Obesity (Silver Spring)

Indexing
- ISSN: 1930-7381 (print); 1930-739X (web)

Links
- Journal homepage; Online archive

Obesity is a monthly peer-reviewed medical journal covering research into obesity. It was established in 1993 under the name Obesity Research, obtaining its current name in 2006. It is published by Wiley-Blackwell on behalf of the Obesity Society, of which it is the official journal. The editor-in-chief is Eric Ravussin (Pennington Biomedical Research Center). According to the Journal Citation Reports, the journal has a 2020 impact factor of 5.002.
