= Paul Stewart (endocrinologist) =

Paul Stewart CBE FMedSci FRCP
- Born: 6 July 1959 (age 67); Harrogate, West Riding of Yorkshire, England
- Education: University of Edinburgh
- Awards: FRCP (1995); FMedSci (1999)
- Scientific career
- Fields: Medicine; Endocrinology; Corticosteroids
- Workplaces: University of Leeds; Leeds Teaching Hospitals NHS Trust
- Doctoral advisor: Professor Sir Christopher Edwards
- Website: medhealth.leeds.ac.uk/profile/1012/overview

Paul Michael Stewart (born 6 July 1959) is Dean of Medicine and Health at the University of Leeds and an Honorary Consultant Endocrinologist at the Leeds Teaching Hospitals NHS Trust. He is also currently Vice President of the Academy of Medical Sciences and the editor-in-chief of The Journal of Clinical Endocrinology and Metabolism.

Stewart is the primary investigator for the National Institute for Health Research Musculoskeletal Biomedical Research Unit in Leeds, and specialises in the role of hormones in human aging, obesity and reproductive medicine. He is also a National Institute for Health Research Senior Clinical Investigator, and leads a group researching a class of steroid hormones known as corticosteriods and their role in human disease. He is an elected fellow of the Royal College of Physicians and the Academy of Medical Sciences.

He delivered the 1997 Goulstonian Lecture at the Royal College of Physicians.
