= Martha Zeiger =

American endocrine surgeon

- Spouse: John Britton

Academic background
- Education: BA, Brown University; MD, Robert Larner College of Medicine

Academic work
- Institutions: National Institutes of Health; University of Virginia; Johns Hopkins School of Medicine

Martha A. Zeiger is an American endocrine surgeon and scientist. She is currently Director of the Center for Cancer Research Office of Surgeon-Scientist Career Development at the National Institutes of Health (NIH). She is also an adjunct investigator in the Surgical Oncology Program at NIH's National Cancer Institute, where she previously served as director. She was the S. Hurt Watts Professor and Chair of the Department of Surgery at the University of Virginia. Prior to joining academia, Zeiger spent six years in the United States Navy as General Medical Officer, Commander and Surgeon in San Diego, Hawaii and Washington, D.C.

== Early life and education ==
Zeiger was born to a war veteran father who served in World War II as an engineer on the USS Indianapolis. She enrolled at Brown University for her undergraduate degree and the Robert Larner College of Medicine at the University of Vermont for her medical degree before entering the United States Navy. Her surgical training included a surgery residency at Maine Medical Center and a surgical oncology fellowship at the National Cancer Institutes, NIH. She spent six years with the navy as a General Medical Officer, Commander and Surgeon in San Diego, Hawaii and Washington, D.C before joining academia.

== Career ==
In 1993, Zeiger joined the faculty at Johns Hopkins School of Medicine (JHU) where she established an endocrine surgery practice, endocrine surgery fellowship, and directed a molecular biology laboratory. There she rose to Chief of Endocrine Surgery and Associate Dean for Postdoctoral Fellows. She eventually left JHU in 2017 to become the S. Hurt Watts Professor and Chair of the Department of Surgery at the University of Virginia. In 2019, Zeiger was the recipient of the Braverman Distinguished Award from the American Thyroid Association (ATA) as someone who has "demonstrated excellence and passion for mentoring fellows, students, and junior faculty; has a long history of productive thyroid research; and is devoted to the ATA." During the same year, Zeiger began a one-year term as president of ATA's board of directors. In August 2019, Zeiger accepted a position as the Director of the Surgical Oncology Program at the National Cancer Institute (NCI) at the National Institutes of Health. By 2022, Zeiger began a new position as the Director of the Surgeon-Scientist Career Development, where she has created grant programs to train and support new generations of surgeon-scientists, including the NCI Early-Stage Surgeon Scientist Program.

== Personal life ==
Zeiger is married to John Britton, a pediatric anesthesiologist, and they have two children together, Tenaya and Zachary Britton.
