= Victoria Falls Bridge =

Transnational bridge connecting Zambia and Zimbabwe

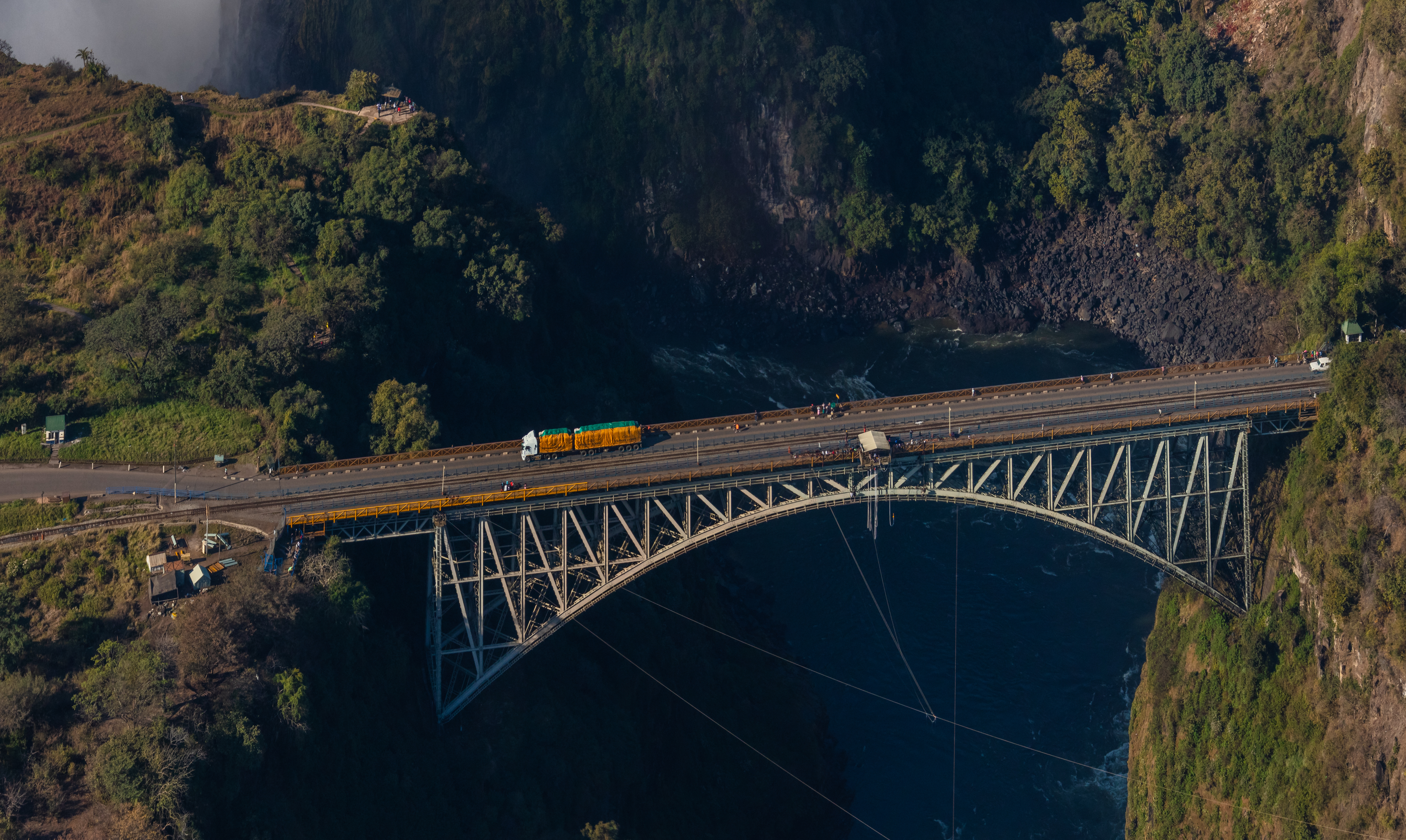
- Coordinates: 17°55′42″S 25°51′26″E
- Carries: road, rail, foot traffic
- Crosses: Zambezi River
- Locale: Second Gorge of Victoria Falls, crossing the Zimbabwe-Zambia border
- Maintained by: National railways of Zimbabwe and Zambia

Characteristics
- Design: Parabolic arch
- Material: Steel
- Total length: 198 metres (650 ft)
- Height: 128 metres (420 ft)
- Longest span: 156.5 metres (513 ft)
- No. of spans: 1
- Piers in water: 0

History
- Designer: G. A. Hobson
- Constructed by: Cleveland Bridge & Engineering Company
- Construction start: 1904
- Construction end: 1905

Location
- Interactive map of Victoria Falls Bridge

The Victoria Falls Bridge crosses the Zambezi River just below the Victoria Falls and is built over the Second Gorge of the falls. As the river forms the border between Zimbabwe and Zambia, the bridge links the two countries and has border posts on the approaches to both ends, at the towns of Victoria Falls, Zimbabwe, and Livingstone, Zambia.

== History ==
The bridge was the brainchild of Cecil Rhodes, part of his grand and unfulfilled Cape to Cairo railway scheme, even though he never visited the falls and died before construction of the bridge began. Rhodes is recorded as instructing the engineers to "build the bridge across the Zambezi where the trains, as they pass, will catch the spray of the Falls". It was designed by George Andrew Hobson of consultants Sir Douglas Fox and Partners, assisted by the stress calculations of Ralph Freeman, who was later the principal designer of the Sydney Harbour Bridge. The main central arch is a parabolic curve.

The bridge was prefabricated in Darlington, England by the Cleveland Bridge & Engineering Company, before being shipped to the port city of Beira in Portuguese-ruled Mozambique, and then transported on the newly constructed railway to the Victoria Falls. It took just 14 months to construct and was completed in 1905.

The bridge was officially opened by Professor Sir George Darwin, son of Charles Darwin and President of the British Association (now the British Science Association), on 12 September 1905. The American Society of Civil Engineers has designated the bridge as an International Historic Civil Engineering Landmark.

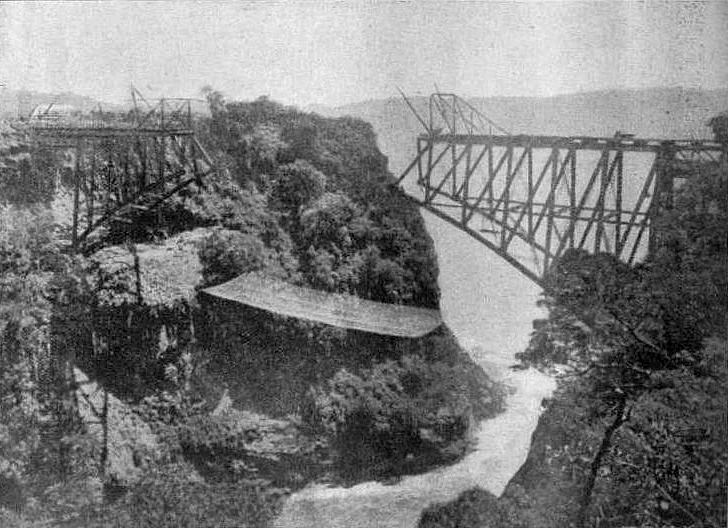
The bridge under construction in 1905

Constructed from steel, the bridge is 198 metres (650 ft) long, with a main arch spanning 156.50 metres (513.5 ft), at a height of 128 metres (420 ft) above the lower water mark of the river in the gorge below. It carries a road, railway and footway. The bridge is the only rail link between Zambia and Zimbabwe and one of only three road links between the two countries.

The Victoria Falls Bridge did not bring the first train or the first railway to Northern Rhodesia (called Zambia since 1964). To push on with construction of the railway north as fast as possible, Cecil Rhodes insisted that the Livingstone to Kalomo line be laid before the bridge was finished. Then a locomotive was conveyed in pieces across the gorge by the temporary electric cableway used for the transportation of the bridge materials and nicknamed the 'Blondin' by the construction engineers. The locomotive was re-assembled and entered service months before the bridge was complete.

For more than 50 years, the bridge was crossed regularly by passenger trains as part of the principal route between the then Northern Rhodesia, southern Africa and Europe. Freight trains carried mainly copper ore (later, copper ingots) and timber out of Northern Rhodesia, and coal into the country.

The age of the bridge and maintenance problems have led to traffic restrictions at times. Trains cross at less than walking pace and trucks were limited to 30 t, necessitating heavier trucks making a long diversion via the Kazungula Ferry or Chirundu Bridge. The limit was raised after repairs in 2006, but proposals for more fundamental rehabilitation or construction of a new bridge have been aired.

The toll on the bridge was abolished in 1906.

During the Rhodesian UDI crisis and Bush War, the bridge was frequently closed (and regular passenger services have not resumed successfully). In 1975, the bridge was the site of unsuccessful peace talks when the parties met in a train carriage poised above the gorge for nine and a half hours. In 1980, freight and road services resumed and have continued without interruption except for maintenance.

Today, one of the Victoria Falls Bridge's main attraction are historical guided tours focusing on the construction of the bridge and include a walking tour under the main deck. On the Zambian side there is a small museum about the bridge which is free to enter and contains a café selling refreshments. Also located on the bridge is the Shearwater 111 metres (364 ft) bungee jump including a bungee swing and zip-line. Concerns about safety of the attraction were raised in late 2011 after the bungee's cord snapped and a young Australian woman fell 24 metres (79 ft) into the fast-flowing river (she survived).

The bridge was originally referred to as the Great Zambesi or Zambezi Bridge, later becoming known as the Victoria Falls Bridge.

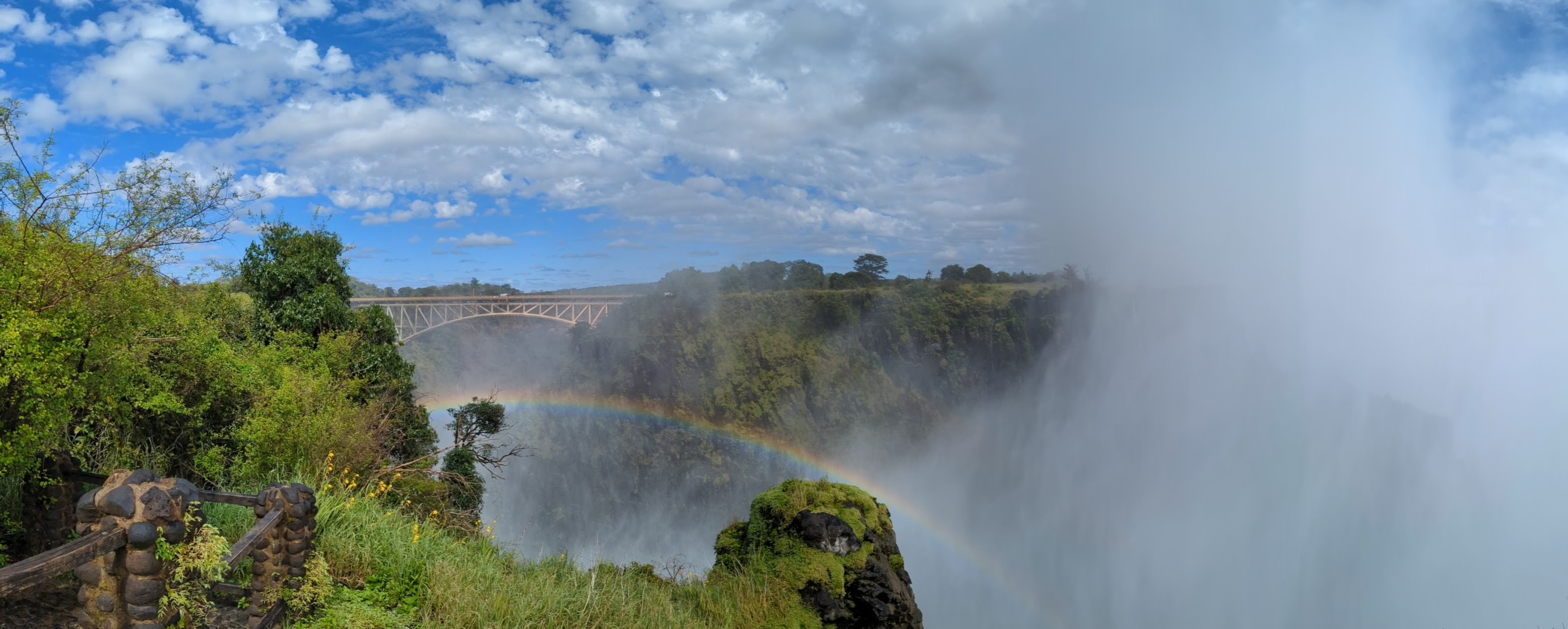
Victoria Falls Bridge from the Knife Edge Bridge trail near the falls on the Zambia side

== Gallery ==
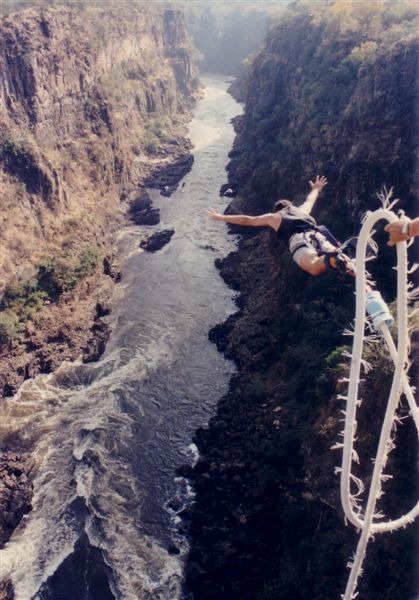
Bungee jumping off the Victoria Falls Bridge

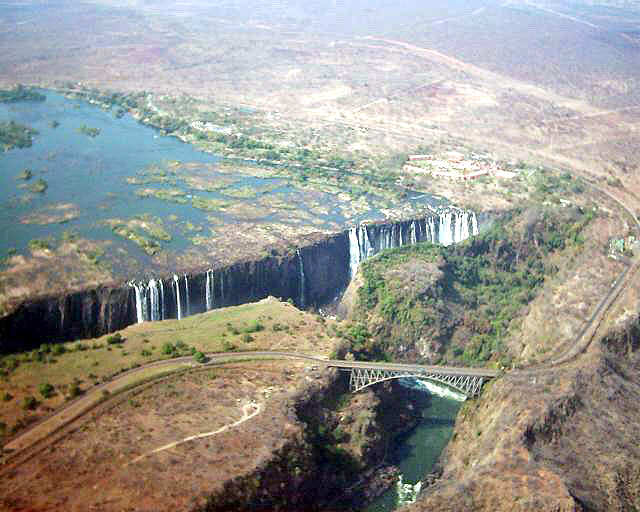
Victoria Falls Bridge

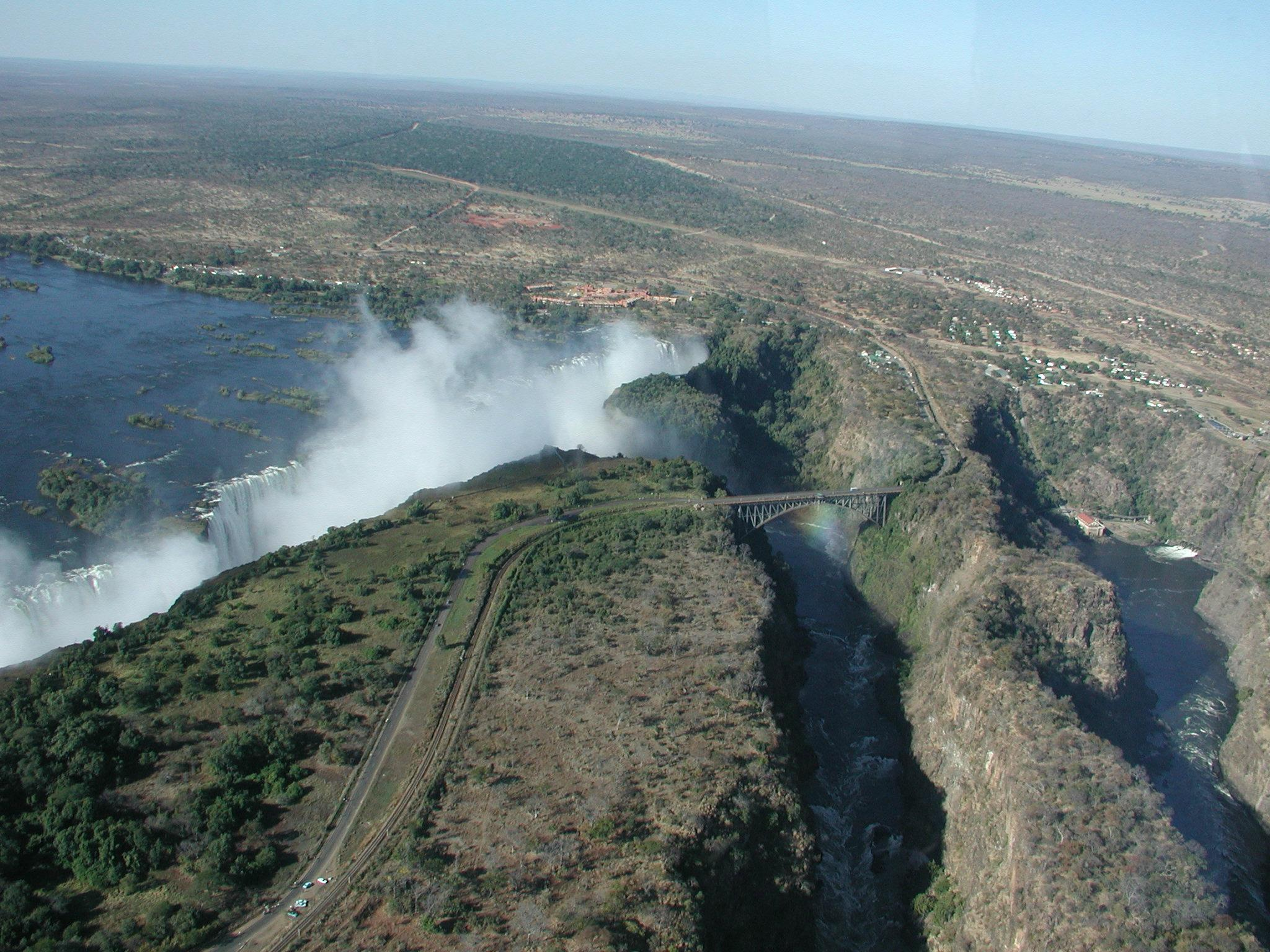
Helicopter view

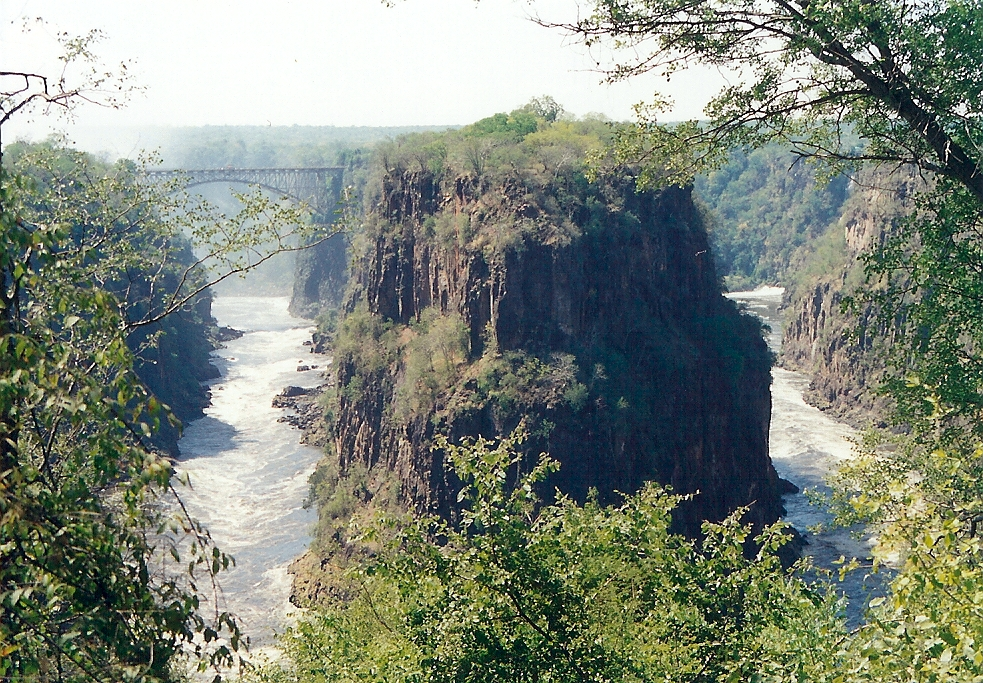
Victoria Falls gorge with Victoria Falls Bridge in background

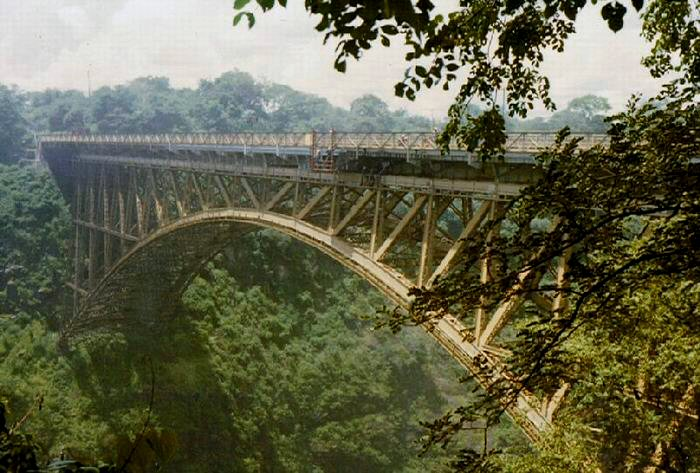
Bridge in 1975

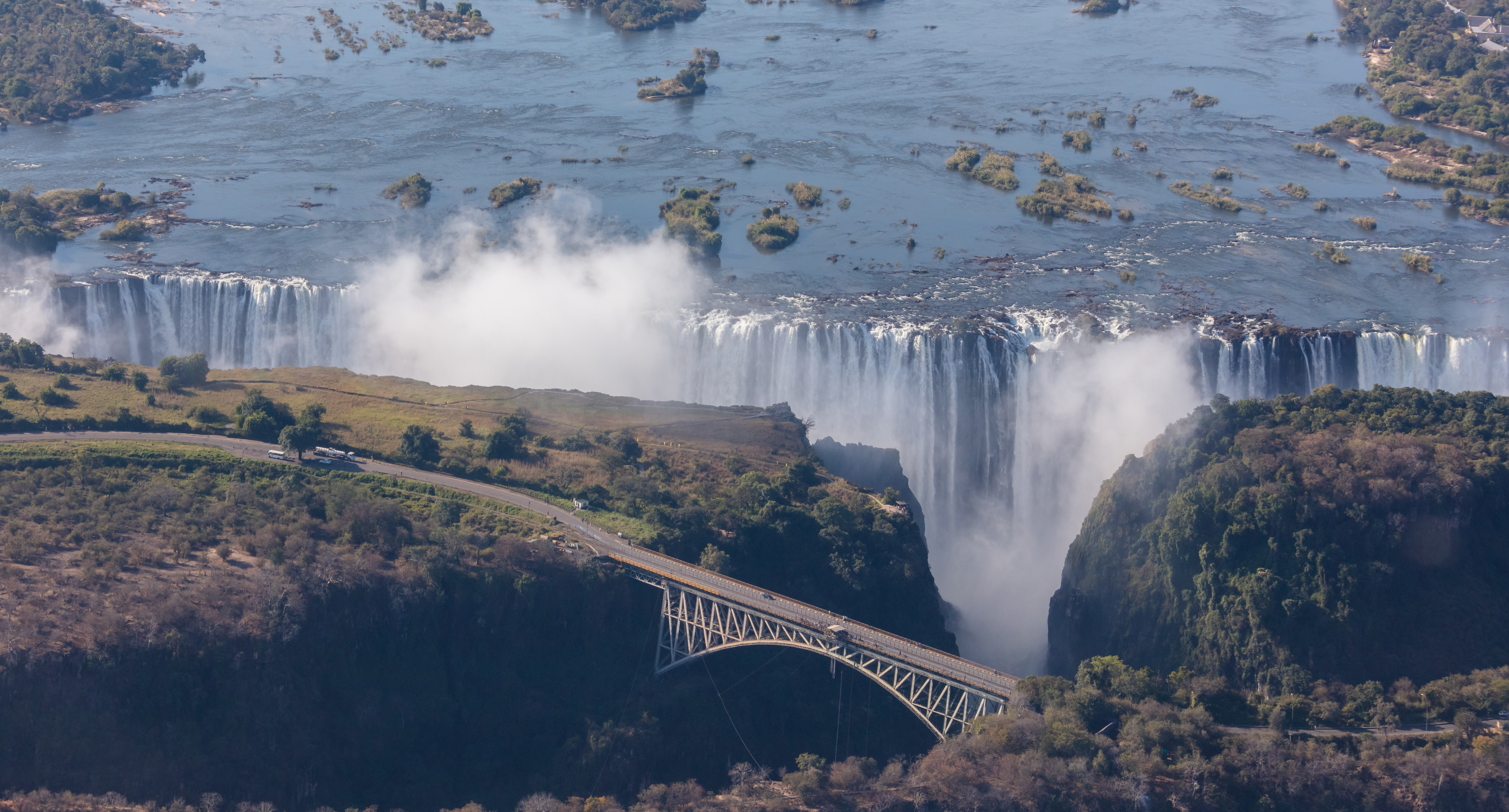
View of the bridge and the falls

== See also ==
- List of crossings of the Zambezi River
- List of international bridges
