= Experimental Cell Research =

- Discipline: Cell biology
- Language: English
- Edited by: Andras Simon

Publication details
- History: 1950–present
- Publisher: Elsevier
- Frequency: Semimonthly
- Impact factor: 3.905 (2020)

Standard abbreviations
- ISO 4: Exp. Cell Res.

Indexing
- CODEN: ECREAL
- ISSN: 0014-4827 (print); 1090-2422 (web)
- LCCN: 54001254
- OCLC no.: 474767727

Links
- Journal homepage; Online access

Experimental Cell Research is a peer-reviewed scientific journal covering cell biology. It was established in 1950 by Academic Press and is currently published by Elsevier.
