= Endocrinology (journal) =

- Discipline: Endocrinology
- Language: English
- Edited by: Zane B. Andrews, PhD

Publication details
- History: 1917–present
- Publisher: The Endocrine Society (United States)
- Frequency: Monthly
- Impact factor: 3.8 (2023)

Standard abbreviations
- ISO 4: Endocrinology

Indexing
- CODEN: ENDOAO
- ISSN: 0013-7227 (print); 1945-7170 (web)
- LCCN: sg39000030
- OCLC no.: 818916544

Links
- Journal homepage

Endocrinology is a peer-reviewed scientific journal published by The Endocrine Society. The current editor-in-chief is Zane B. Andrews, PhD. It is the Society's oldest journal and was established in 1917.

Endocrinology, the flagship basic science journal of the Endocrine Society, publishes original, foundational research investigating endocrine function in health and disease at all levels of biological organization, including molecular mechanistic studies of hormone-receptor interactions and hormone-regulated signaling events. Endocrinology articles include cross-disciplinary and integrative research in traditionally recognized fields of endocrinology as well as molecular studies in emerging areas of endocrine-related research, including mechanisms of signal transduction, the biochemistry and structural biology of receptors or other signaling molecules, epigenetic mechanisms of gene regulation and transcription, mitochondrial biochemistry, bioenergetics, cellular metabolism, and stem cell biology/tissue regeneration.
