= The Journal of Clinical Endocrinology and Metabolism =

- Discipline: Endocrinology, metabolism
- Language: English
- Edited by: Paul Stewart

Publication details
- Former name(s): Journal of Clinical Endocrinology
- History: 1941–1951: Journal of Clinical Endocrinology; 1952-present: Journal of Clinical Endocrinology and Metabolism (after a partial merge with Transactions of the American Goiter Association)
- Publisher: The Endocrine Society (United States)
- Frequency: Monthly
- Impact factor: 5.605 (2018)

Standard abbreviations
- ISO 4: J. Clin. Endocrinol. Metab.

Indexing
- CODEN: JCEMAZ
- ISSN: 0021-972X (print); 1945-7197 (web)
- OCLC no.: 7747175

Links
- Journal homepage

The Journal of Clinical Endocrinology and Metabolism is a peer-reviewed medical journal in the field of endocrinology and metabolism. The current editor-in-chief is Paul Stewart.
