= Pennington Biomedical Research Center =

Research center in Baton Rouge, Louisiana

Pennington Biomedical Research Center (PBRC)

About the Center
- Established: 1981
- Executive Director: Jennifer Rood, Ph.D.
- Faculty: Approximately 80
- Postdoc. Fellows: Approximately 25
- Staff: Over 500
- Operating Budget: $94 million (FY 2025–2026)
- Campus: 222-acre (0.90 km^{2})
- Address: 6400 Perkins Road, Baton Rouge, Louisiana, 70808
- Country: US
- Website: www.pbrc.edu
- Affiliations: Louisiana State University

Research Funding
- National Institutes of Health
- U.S. Department of Defense
- U.S. Department of Agriculture
- State of Louisiana
- Pennington Biomedical Research Foundation

The Pennington Biomedical Research Center is a health science-focused research center in Baton Rouge, Louisiana. It is part of the Louisiana State University System and conducts clinical, basic, and population science research. It is the largest academically-based nutrition research center in the world, with the greatest number of obesity researchers on faculty. The center's over 500 employees occupy several buildings on the 222-acre (0.90 km^{2}) campus. The center was designed by the Baton Rouge architect John Desmond.

== History ==
In 1980, Baton Rouge oilman and philanthropist C. B. "Doc" Pennington and his wife, Irene, provided $125 million to fund construction of the nutritional research center. With a U.S. Department of Defense contract and funding from the Louisiana Public Facilities Authority, Governor Buddy Roemer proclaimed the official opening of the Center in 1988. Dr George A. Bray, a renowned obesity researcher, was recruited to be the first executive director of the center and under his leadership the center reached its present status in the scientific world.

Today, the Pennington Biomedical Research Center houses almost 600 employees, 44 research laboratories, 16 core service laboratories, an inpatient and outpatient clinic, four metabolic chambers, a research kitchen, an administrative area, more than $20 million in technologically advanced equipment, and a team of over 80 scientists and physicians with specialties such as molecular biology, genomics and proteomics, neuroanatomy, exercise physiology, biochemistry, psychology, endocrinology, biostatistics and electrophysiology.

One of the former employees was the late state legislator Leonard J. Chabert from Terrebonne Parish, the namesake of the Leonard J. Chabert Medical Center in Houma.

== Research programs and labs ==
The comprehensive research program at the Pennington Biomedical Research Center focuses on ten specific research program areas as outlined below. Researchers in these divisions rely on the latest molecular, physiological, clinical, behavioral, and bioinformatics technologies with the ultimate goal of preventing common diseases such as heart disease, diabetes, hypertension, and cancer.

- Cancer: Clinical Oncology & Metabolism, Cancer Energetics
- Diabetes: Antioxidant and Gene Regulation, John S McIlhenny Skeletal Muscle Physiology, John S. McIlhenny Botanical Research, Joint Program on Diabetes, Endocrinology and Metabolism, Oxidative Stress and Disease
- Epidemiology and Prevention: Chronic Disease Epidemiology, Contextual Risk Factors, Nutritional Epidemiology, Physical Activity and Obesity Epidemiology
- Genomics & Molecular Genetics: Gene-Nutrient Interactions, Genetics of Eating Behavior, Human Genomics, Regulation of Gene Expression
- Neurobiology: Autonomic Neuroscience, Leptin Signaling in the Brain, Neurobiology & Nutrition, Neurobiology of Metabolic Dysfunction Lab, Neurosignaling, Nutrition & Neural Signaling,
- Neurodegeneration: Aging and Neurodegeneration, Blood Brain Barrier I, Blood Brain Barrier II, Inflammation and Neurodegeneration, Nutritional Neuroscience and Aging
- Nutrient Sensing & Signaling: Nutrient Sensing and Adipocyte Signaling
- Obesity: Behavior Modification Clinical Trials, Behavior Technology Laboratory: Eating Disorders and Obesity, Behavioral Medicine, Infection and Obesity, Ingestive Behavior Laboratory, Pediatric Obesity and Health Behavior, Pharmacology-based Clinical Trials, Reproductive Endocrinology & Women's Health, Women's Health, Eating Behavior, & Smoking Cessation Program
- Physical Activity & Health: Exercise Biology, Human Physiology, Inactivity Physiology, Physical Activity & Ethnic Minority Health, Preventive Medicine, Walking Behavior
- Stem Cell & Developmental Biology: Developmental Biology, Epigenetics & Nuclear Reprogramming, Ubiquitin Biology

== Core services ==
Pennington Biomedical Research Center provides core services in three specific areas (i.e., Basic Science, Clinical Science, and Population Science) to support researchers and increase the efficiency and accuracy of investigative procedures.

1. The Basic Science Core allows researchers to use cutting edge technology in the following areas: comparative biology, animal behavior, animal metabolism, cell and tissue imaging and microscopy, cell culture facilities, genomics, transgenics, proteomics and metabolomics.
2. The Clinical Science Core provides researchers access to clinical research study protocol development tools, Internal Review Board (IRB) submission, budgeting assistance, and contract support. The center assists with study participant recruitment, specimen collection, processing and analysis, dietary assessment, exercise testing, psychological review, and phlebotomy. This core also provides meal preparation using the Metabolic Kitchen and provides support for data collection and storage.
3. The Population Science Core provides researchers with statistical support for studies, data management assistance, and access to the Library and Information Center which provides bibliographic instruction, interlibrary loan processing, and other services.

== Centers of excellence ==
Pennington Biomedical is home to several NIH-funded research centers, along with other state and federally funded partnerships. Supported by center grants, these prestigious designations are awarded to institutions with groups of established investigators working in areas of scientific emphasis as defined by the National Institutes of Health. In addition, other center and institute partnerships highlight Pennington Biomedical's work with the nation's military, bariatric surgery and healthy aging.

There are three NIH Centers of Excellence at Pennington Biomedical Research Center:

- Center of Biomedical Research Excellence (COBRE)
- Louisiana Clinical & Translational Science Center (LA CaTS)
- Nutrition and Obesity Research Center (NORC)
