= The Obesity Society =

Scientific society

The Obesity Society is a scientific society dedicated to the study of obesity and its treatment. It was founded in 1982 and has approximately 2,500 members.

The official scientific journal of the society is Obesity, which is available in print and online and is published on behalf of the society by Wiley-Blackwell.

The society organizes an Annual Scientific Meeting, which it joined with that of the American Society for Metabolic & Bariatric Surgery in 2013, calling the week-long event "ObesityWeek".
