= Gaonkar =

Gaonkar is a surname of Indian origin. It can be found among the members of various castes including the Nador (Nadavaru), the Maratha, and other castes from Goa and Maharashtra.

Notable people with the surname include:

- Dilip P. Gaonkar (born 1945), American academic and writer
- Gopal Gaonkar (born 1938), American academic
- Harish Gaonkar (born 1946), Indian lepidopterist
- Mala Gaonkar, American businesswoman
- Meghana Gaonkar, Indian actress
- Sannappa Parameshwar Gaonkar (1885–1972), Indian politician and writer
