= Tulane University School of Science and Engineering =

- Type: Private
- Established: 2005
- Dean: Hridesh Rajan
- Students: 2,685 undergraduate, 476 graduate
- Location: New Orleans, Louisiana, United States; 29.9378°N 90.1209°W
- Campus: Urban
- Website: sse.tulane.edu

The Tulane University School of Science and Engineering (SSE) was established in the fall of 2005 as part of the Tulane Renewal Plan, when the Faculty of the Liberal Arts and Sciences and the School of Engineering were reorganized into two schools, the School of Science and Engineering and the School of Liberal Arts.

Engineering at Tulane University dates back to 1894 when the university organized the College of Technology, which later became the School of Engineering.

== Degree programs ==
Tulane SSE offers degrees in applied mathematics, behavioral health, bioinnovation, biological chemistry, biomedical engineering, cell and molecular biology, chemical and biomolecular engineering, chemistry, civil engineering, computer science, data science, earth and environmental science, ecology and evolutionary biology, electrical engineering, engineering physics, environmental biology, landscape architecture and engineering, materials physics and engineering, materials science and engineering, mathematics, mechanical engineering, neuroscience, physics, psychology, river-coastal science and engineering, and statistics.

== Location ==
A ten-building complex on Tulane University's Uptown New Orleans campus includes the Lindy Claiborne Boggs Center for Energy and Biotechnology, the Merryl and Sam Israel Jr. Environmental Sciences Building, Pervical Stern Hall, Stanley O. Thomas Hall, Alcee Fortier Hall, Walter E. Blessey Hall, the Francis M. Taylor Laboratories, and the newly completed Steven and Jann Paul Hall. Other buildings include the J. Bennett Johnston Health and Environmental Research Building in Downtown New Orleans, the Reily Student Recreation Center, and facilities at University Square. The Reily Center houses the Center for Anatomical and Movement Sciences (CAMS) as well as the Tulane Institute of Sports Medicine (TISM).

=== Campus improvements ===
In November 2008, the university announced that donors would fund a project to create a more pedestrian-friendly environment by eliminating a street with automobile traffic that bisected the center of the campus. Referred to as the McAlister Place project, the street was replaced with a crushed-granite surface bordered with Japanese magnolias and irises, and completed in January 2010.

After Hurricane Katrina, the City of New Orleans improved bicycle lanes on nearby Carrollton Avenue and in 2011, announced plans to add bicycle lanes to the St. Charles Avenue corridor that runs in front of campus.

== Deans ==
- Hridesh Rajan (2024–Present)
- Kimberly L. Foster (2018 - 2024)
- Michael Herman, Ph.D. (interim) (2017 - 2018)
- Nick Altiero (2006 - 2017)

== Notable professors ==
- Frank Tipler
- John P. Perdew
- Joan W. Bennett
- Ibrahim Demir
- Esther Calzada
- Cynthia Ebinger
- Alexander Wentzell – Retired
- Thomas W. Sherry – Retired
- Joseph L. Bull – Former professor. Former John and Elsie Martinez Biomedical Engineering Chair and associate dean for research at Tulane. He is a biomedical engineer and is the first enrolled member of a federally recognized tribe to serve as a dean of an engineering college in the United States.
- James MacLaren – Former professor

== See also ==
- Tulane University
- Newcomb-Tulane College
- Notable Alumni
