= New Orleans Downtown Development District =

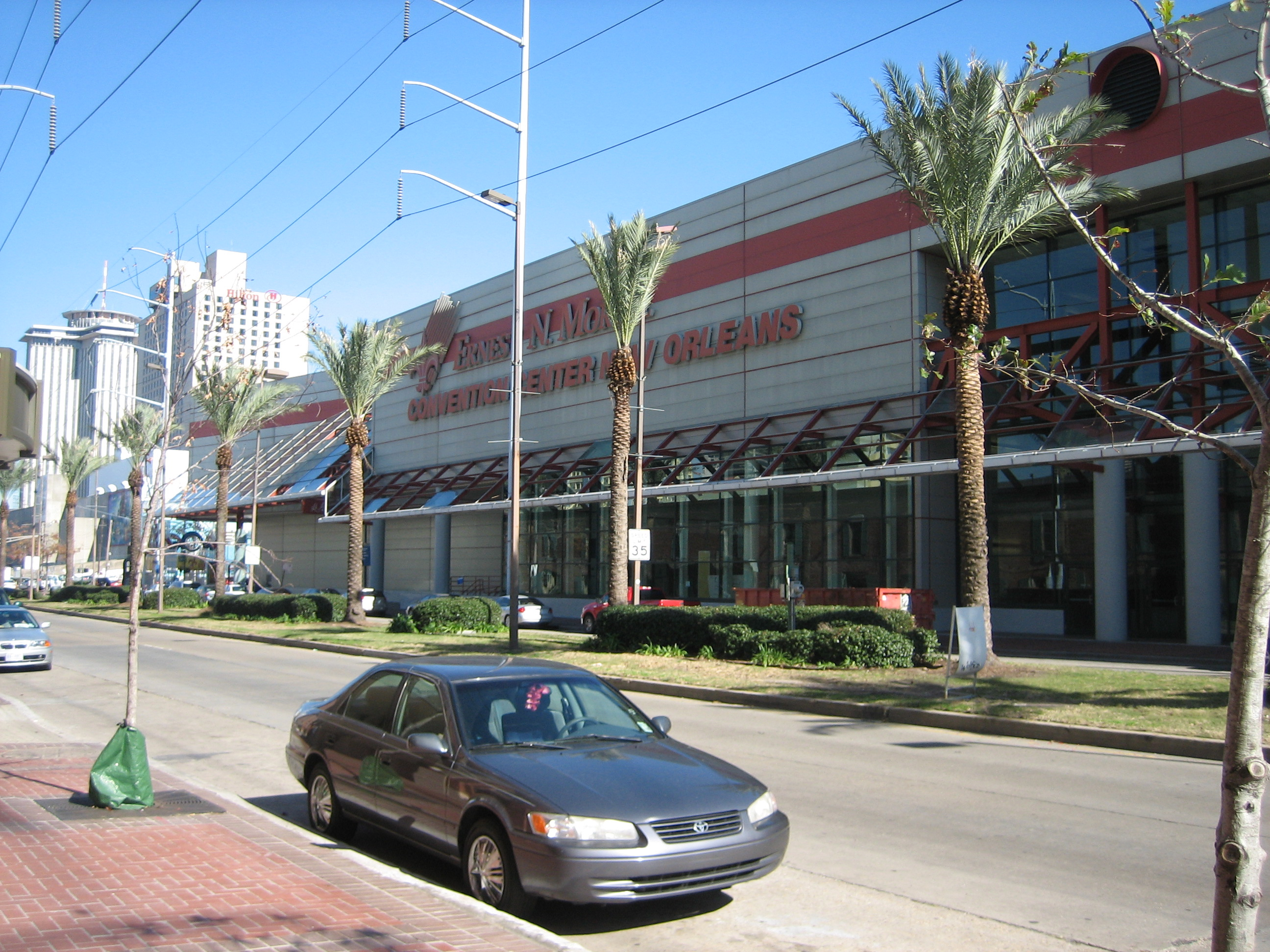
A portion of the Morial Convention Center Complex, located within the Warehouse District, from Convention Center Boulevard

The Downtown Development District in New Orleans is a legal definition and entity originated in 1974, when the Louisiana Legislature created the New Orleans Downtown Development District, a business improvement district (BID) bordered by Iberville Street, the Pontchartrain Expressway, Claiborne Avenue, and the Mississippi River.

This district is anchored by the CBD, but it excludes the French Quarter. The DDD also incorporates the Warehouse District, as well as landmarks like the Mercedes-Benz Superdome, the Smoothie King Center, the New Orleans Morial Convention Center, The Outlet Collection at Riverwalk, the Crescent City Connection, and Canal Place.

== See also ==
- Downtown New Orleans
- New Orleans Central Business District
