= Tulane University School of Liberal Arts =

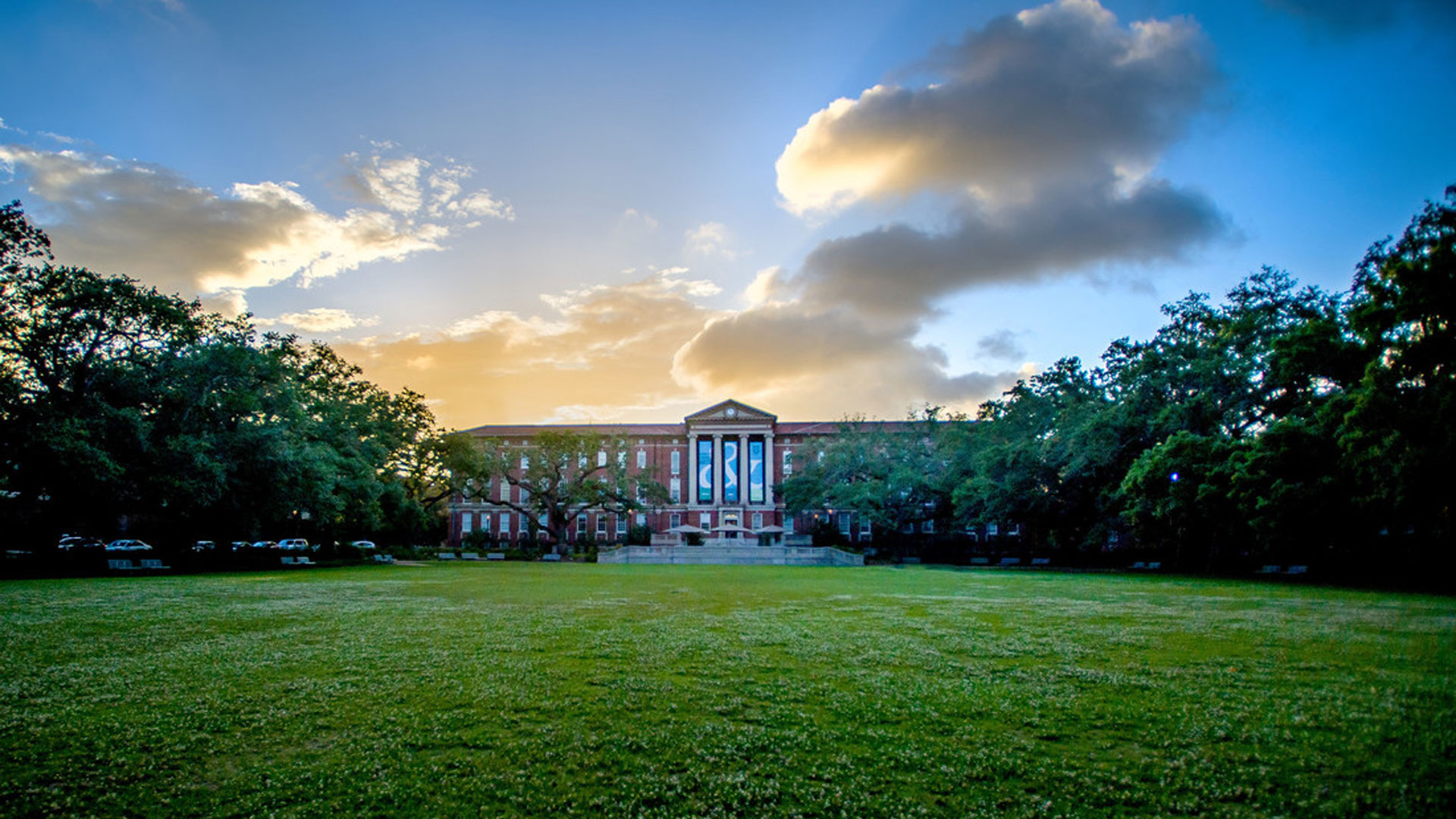
- Newcomb Hall
- Type: Private
- Established: 2005
- Dean: Brian T. Edwards, Ph.D.
- Location: New Orleans, Louisiana, USA
- Campus: Urban
- Website: liberalarts.tulane.edu

The Tulane University School of Liberal Arts (SLA) is a part of Tulane University and was developed as part of the university’s Renewal Plan following Hurricane Katrina in 2005, which in part separated the School of Liberal Arts from the School of Science and Engineering. Brian T. Edwards is the current dean of the School of Liberal Arts, where he is also professor of English, after joining Tulane in 2018. Prior to that, Carole Haber, professor of history at the School, served as dean from 2008 to 2018.

== Scope ==
The School of Liberal Arts encompasses the fine arts, humanities, and social sciences through 17 departments and 15 interdisciplinary programs as well as the Carroll Gallery, Shakespeare Festival, Summer Lyric Theatre, and the Middle American Research Institute. The School of Liberal Arts is the largest of Tulane's nine schools with the greatest number of enrolled students, faculty members, majors, minors, and graduate programs. The academic departments include Anthropology, Art (Studio and Art History), Classical Studies, Communication, Economics, English, French and Italian, German and Slavic Studies, History, Music, Philosophy, Political Science, Sociology, Spanish and Portuguese, Theatre and Dance. SLA departments and programs are currently housed in Newcomb Hall, the Woldenberg Art Center, Dixon Hall, and McWilliams Hall located on the Newcomb Quad as well as Dinwiddie, Tilton, Hebert, Jones, and Norman Mayer Halls located on the Academic Quad.

== Notable professors ==
- William Balée
- Jean-Godefroy Bidima
- Elizabeth Hill Boone
- William Craft Brumfield
- James Carville
- Peter Cooley
- Scott Cowen
- Kenneth W. Harl
- Walter Isaacson
- Adeline Masquelier
- Tom Sancton
- John Verano
- Jesmyn Ward

== Notable alumni ==
- Blake Bailey, American writer (BA '85)
- Sean M. Berkowitz, American prosecutor (BA '89)
- Lindy Boggs, American politician (Newcomb College, BA '35)
- Andrew Breitbart, American conservative writer and publisher (BA in American Studies '91)
- Ian Bremmer, American political scientist (BA in International Relations '89)
- Neil Bush, American businessman and investor (BA in Economics '77)
- Amy Carter, daughter of the thirty-ninth U.S. President Jimmy Carter and his first lady Rosalynn Carter (BA in Art History '96)
- Doug Ellin, American screenwriter and film and TV director (BA '90)
- Francis George OMI, American cardinal of the Roman Catholic Church (PhD in Philosophy '70)
- Newt Gingrich, American politician and author (MA '68 and PhD '71 in European History)
- Paul Michael Glaser, American actor and director (BA in Theater and English '66)
- Shirley Ann Grau, American writer (Newcomb College, BA '50)
- Scott Greenstein, president of Sirius XM Radio (BA ’81)
- Lauren Hutton, American model and actress (Newcomb College, BA '64)
- Victoria Reggie Kennedy, American attorney and activist (Newcomb College, BA '76)
- Bruce Paltrow, American television and film director and producer (BA in Painting ’65)
- Michael Price, American writer and television producer (MFA in Theater '86)
- Richard Rudolph, American songwriter and musician (BA ’68)
- Terry Schnuck, American Tony-winner theater producer (BA '75)
- Jerry Springer, English-born American television personality (BA in Political Science '65)
- Harold Sylvester, American film and television actor (BA in Theater and Psychology '72)
- John Kennedy Toole, American novelist (BA in English '58)
- Linda S. Wilson, American scholar (Newcomb College, BA '57)

== See also ==
- H. Sophie Newcomb Memorial College
- Tulane University
