= Kevin J. Sullivan (computer scientist) =

American associate professor of computer science

Kevin J. Sullivan is an American associate professor of computer science at the University of Virginia in Charlottesville, Virginia, United States. He also holds the title of Virginia Engineering Foundation (VEF) Endowed Faculty Fellow in computer science at the University of Virginia. He is best known for his work with ultra-large-scale (ULS) systems.

He received a bachelor's degree from Tufts University in 1987, and received MS and PhD degrees in Computer Science and Engineering from the University of Washington in 1994. He has been at the University of Virginia since 1994.

His best known work is on Mediator-based Design Style with David Notkin, on the Galileo: Fault Tree Analysis Tool with Joanne Bechta Dugan. He has also contributed to the design of the Eos (programming language) along with Hridesh Rajan, and is one of many co-authors of the report Ultra-Large-Scale (ULS) Systems: The Software Challenge of the Future

His most cited papers as shown in Scopus are:

- "Software reflexion models: Bridging the gap between source and high-level models", by Murphy, Gail C., Notkin, David, Sullivan, Kevin, Proceedings of the ACM SIGSOFT Symposium on the Foundations of Software Engineering 1995, pp. 18–27., cited 105 times
- "Software reflexion models: Bridging the gap between design and implementation" by Murphy, G.C., Notkin, D., Sullivan, K.J. IEEE Transactions on Software Engineering. 27 (4), 2001, pp. 364–380, cited 99 times.
- "Modular software design with crosscutting interfaces" by Griswold, W.G., Shonle, M., Sullivan, K., Song, Y., Tewari, N., Cai, Y., Rajan, H IEEE Software 23 (1), pp. 51–60, 2006, cited 66 times.
