= Downtown =

Term for a city's central business district

Downtown is a term primarily used in North American English to refer to a city's sometimes commercial, cultural and often the historical, political, and geographic heart of the city. It is often synonymous with its central business district (CBD). It may also be a center for shopping and entertainment. Downtowns typically contain a small percentage of a city's employment but are concentrated in services, including high-end services (office or white-collar jobs). Sometimes, smaller downtowns include lower population densities and lower incomes than nearby suburbs. It is often distinguished as a hub of public transit and culture.

== History ==
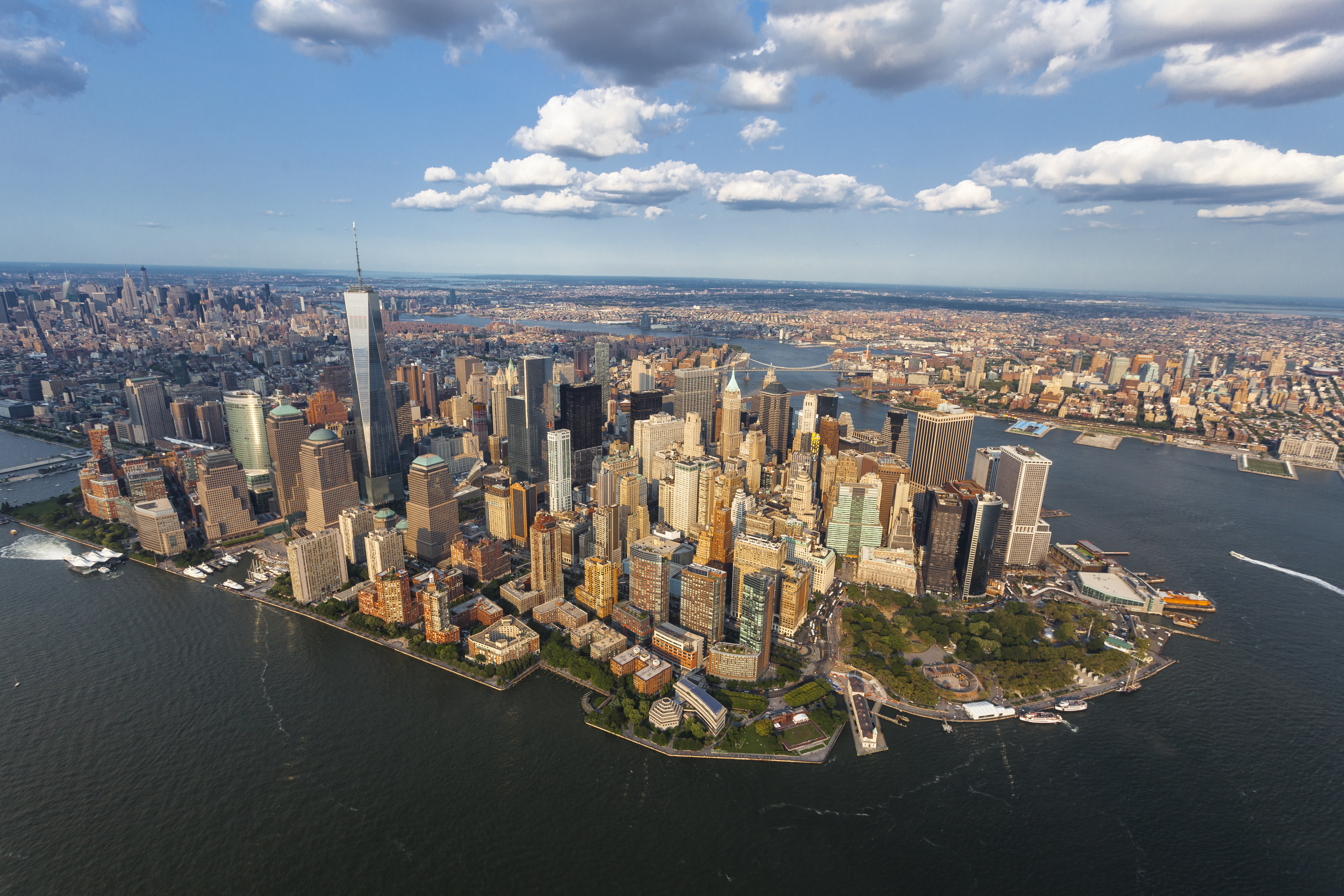
Lower Manhattan at the southern end of Manhattan Island also has a low topographic elevation; it was New York City's original downtown, is the fourth-most populous downtown in the United States, and is often the colloquial signification of the term downtown.

=== Early downtowns and uptowns ===
The Oxford English Dictionary's first citation for "down town" or "downtown" dates to 1770, in reference to the center of Boston. Some have posited that the term "downtown" was coined in New York City, where it was in use by the 1830s to refer to the original settlement, or town, at the southern tip of the island of Manhattan. As the town of New York grew into a city, the only direction it could grow on the island was toward the north, proceeding upriver from the original settlement, the "up" and "down" terminology coming from the customary map design in which up was north and down was south. Thus, anything north of the original town became known as "uptown" (Upper Manhattan), and was generally a residential area, while the original town – which was also New York's only major center of business at the time – became known as "downtown" (Lower Manhattan).

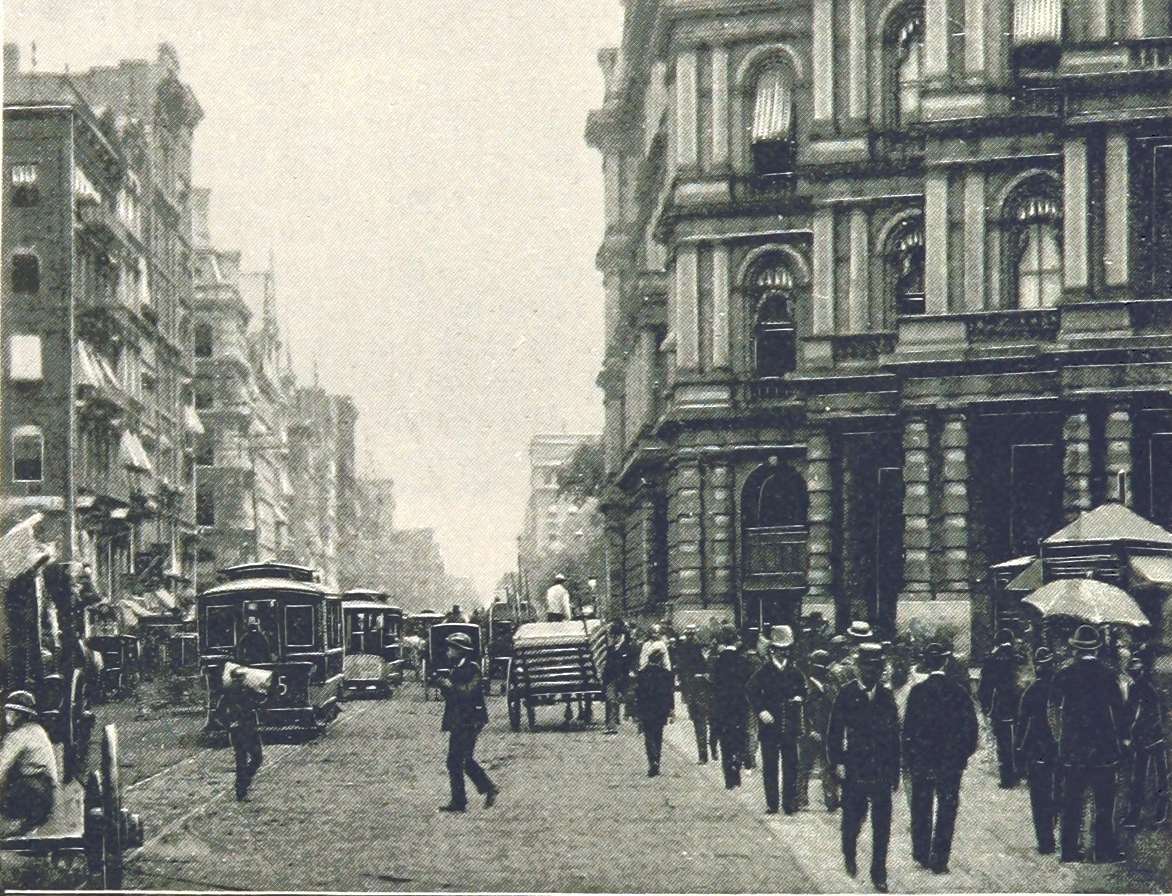
Downtown Manhattan in 1893; looking up Broadway from Barclay Street

During the late 19th century, the term was gradually adopted by cities across the United States to refer to the historical core of the city, which was most often the same as the commercial heart of the city. "Uptown" also spread, but to a much lesser extent. In both cases, though, the directionality of both words was lost, so that someone living in Boston might refer to going "downtown", even though it was north of where they were.

Downtown lay to the south in Detroit, but to the north in Cleveland, to the east in St. Louis, and to the west in Pittsburgh. In Boston, a resident pointed out in 1880, downtown was in the center of the city. Uptown was north of downtown in Cincinnati, but south of downtown in Minneapolis, New Orleans and San Francisco.

Notably, "downtown" was not included in dictionaries as late as the 1880s. But by the early 1900s, "downtown" was clearly established as the proper term in American English for a city's central business district, although the word was virtually unknown in Britain and Western Europe, where expressions such as "city centre" (British English), "el centro" (Spanish), "das Zentrum" (German), etc are used. Even as late as the early part of the 20th century, English travel writers felt it necessary to explain to their readers what "downtown" meant.

Although American downtowns lacked legally defined boundaries, and were often parts of several of the wards that most cities used as their basic functional district, locating the downtown area was not difficult, as it was the place where all the street railways and elevated railways converged, and – at least in most places – where the railroad terminals were. It was the location of the great department stores and hotels, as well as that of theaters, clubs, cabarets, and dance halls, and where skyscrapers were built once that technology was perfected. It was also frequently, at first, the only part of a city that was electrified. It was also the place where street congestion was the worst, a problem for which a solution was never really found.

But most of all, downtown was the place where the city did its business. Inside its small precincts, sometimes as small as several hundred acres, the majority of the trading, selling, and purchasing – retail and wholesale – in the surrounding area would take place. There were hubs of business in other places around the city and its environs, but the downtown area was the chief one, coterminous in almost all cases with the city's central business district. And as more and more business was done downtown, those who had their homes there were gradually pushed out, selling their property and moving to quieter residential areas uptown.

=== Skyscrapers ===
The skyscraper would become the hallmark of the downtown area. Prior to the invention of the elevator – and later the high-speed elevator – buildings were limited in height to about six stories, which was a de facto limit set by the amount of stairs it was assumed that people would climb, but with the elevator, that limit was shattered, and buildings began to be constructed up to about sixteen stories. What limited them then was the thickness of the masonry needed at the base to hold the weight of the building above it. As the buildings got taller, the thickness of the masonry and the space needed for elevators did not allow for sufficient rentable space to make the building profitable. What shattered that restriction was the invention of first the iron- and then the steel frame building, in which the building's load was carried by an internal metal frame skeleton, from which the masonry – and later glass – simply hung, without carrying any weight.

Although first used in Chicago, the steel-framed skyscraper caught on most quickly in New York City in the 1880s, and from there spread to most other American cities in the 1890s and 1900s. The apparent lack of a height limitation of this type of building set off a fervent debate over whether their height should be restricted by law, with proponents and opponents of height limits bringing out numerous arguments in favor of their position. The question of height limits also had a profound implication for the nature of downtown itself: would it continue to be a concentrated core, or as it grew, would height limits force it to spread out into a larger area. In the short run, the proponents of height limits were successful in their efforts. By the 1910s, most of the large and medium-sized cities had height limits in effect, although New York, Philadelphia, Detroit, Pittsburgh, and Minneapolis were notable exceptions.

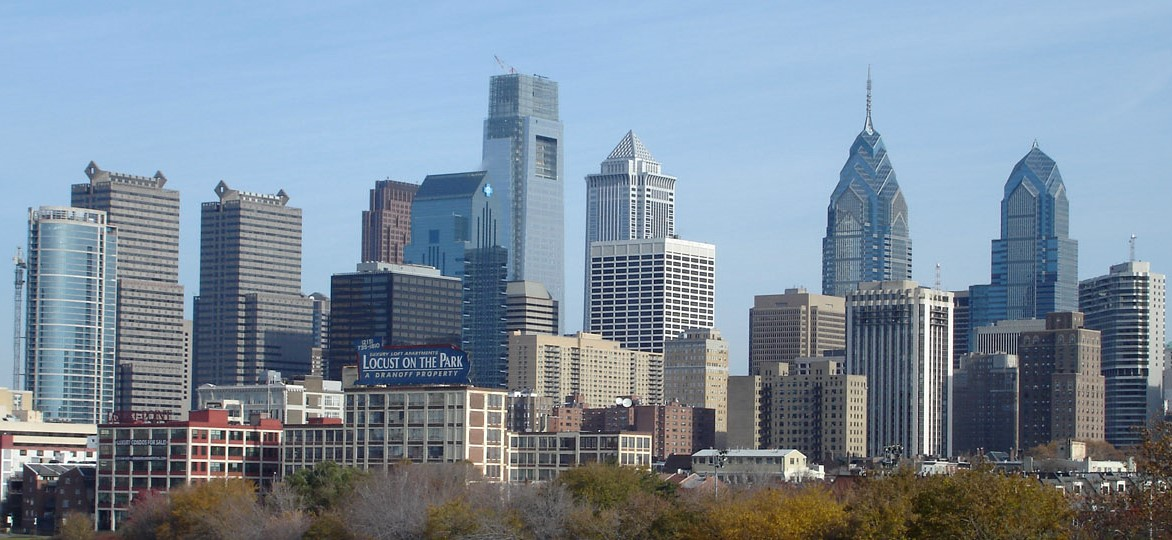
Center City, Philadelphia, the second-most populous downtown in the United States

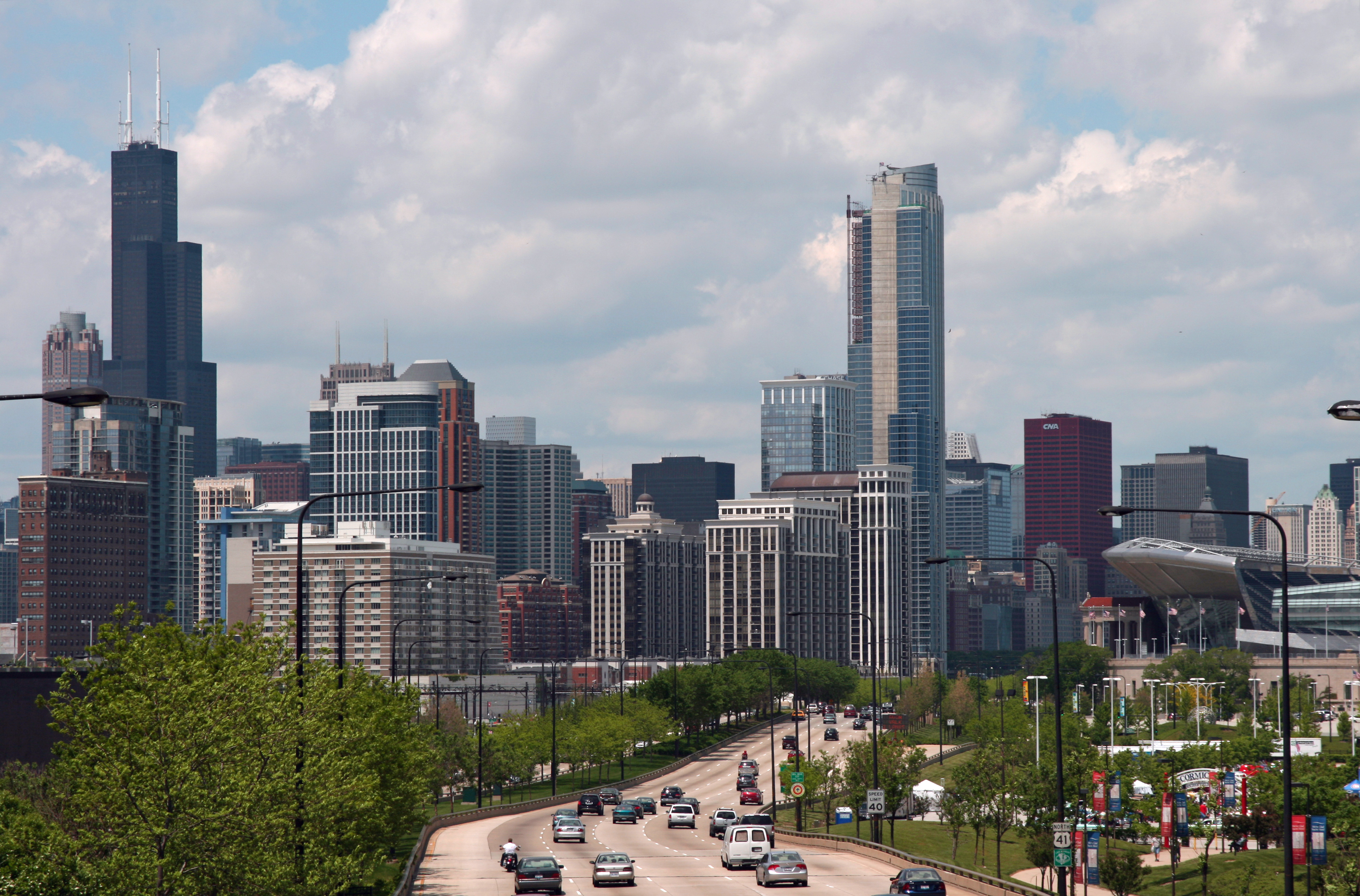
Chicago Loop, the fifth-most populous downtown in the United States

=== Zoning ===
Ultimately, it was not simple height limits that restricted skyscrapers, but they were limited by comprehensive zoning laws which set up separate requirements for different parts of a city. Zoning rules would regulate not only height, but also a building's volume, the percentage of the lot used, and the amount of light the building blocked. Zoning regulations sometimes encouraged setbacks (step-like recessions in the outer wall, making higher-up segments of the building progressively narrower than the base) to reduce a building's bulk by allowing additional height per foot of setback – the exact amount depending on what zone the building was in. The ultimate effect of setbacks is to increase the sunlight and visible sky at street level. New York City was the first to do this, with the 1916 Zoning Resolution, which was prompted in large part by the construction of the Equitable Building in 1915. The Equitable Building was a 40-story building with straight sides and no setbacks, which raised fears of the downtown area becoming a maze of dark streets that never saw the sun. Worse yet, at least from a real estate perspective, this new building created 1.2 million square feet (111,000 m^{2}) of office space, flooding into what was already a sluggish market. To many in the real estate industry, the zoning law was an example of a "reasonable restriction".

Once New York had passed its law, other cities followed, although proposed zoning measures did meet stiff resistance in some places, often because of the inclusion of overly restrictive height limits, and sometimes because the entire concept of zoning was seen as undemocratic and bordering on socialism. Eventually, a model law, the Standard State Zoning Enabling Act of 1922 was drawn up for the guidance of cities wishing to enact zoning regulations, which are now part of virtually every American city.

=== Central business district ===
In the 20th century downtown zones were redeveloped with single-purpose office skyscrapers for commuting employees of companies. The typical downtown was no longer necessarily suitable for mixed-use housing, manufacturing, retail, and whatever else a human may want. In the early 20th century, a downtown area was defined as the business district of the American city. But beginning in the 1920s and 1930s, as cities continued to grow in size and population, rival business districts began to appear outside of downtown in outlying districts. This was the time when the term "central business district" began to appear as more-or-less synonymous with the downtown area. The phrase acknowledged the existence of other business districts in the city, but allocated to downtown the primacy of being "central", not only geographically, in many cities, but also in importance. And in many cases, the downtown area or central business district, itself began to grow, such as in Manhattan where the business district lower Manhattan and the newer one in midtown began to grow towards each other, (Note: The movement of the two districts towards each other was stopped at first by the difficulty of building very tall buildings in the area between them, because the bedrock of Manhattan schist was so deep there, and later by zoning regulations. In effect then, contemporary Manhattan has two "central business districts", the one in Lower Manhattan, usually referred to as the Financial District, and the one in midtown, usually called Midtown Manhattan. "Downtown", therefore, is now primarily a direction, but can also be said to encompass most of Manhattan below Central Park, even though this includes residential neighborhoods such as the Lower East Side, Greenwich Village, Chelsea, the Flatiron District – located around one of the city's very first "skyscrapers", the 22-story Flatiron Building, and Gramercy Park.) or in Chicago, where downtown expanded from the Loop across the Chicago River to Michigan Avenue. In fact, the instability of downtown was a cause for concern for business and real estate interests, as the business district refused to stay where it had been, and shifted its location in response to numerous factors, although it generally stayed fairly compact – in the early 1930s even the largest took up less than 2% of the city's space, and most were significantly smaller – and remained the primary business district of the city.

Real estate interests were particularly concerned about the tendency of downtown to move because the downtown area had by far the highest land values in each city. One commentator said that if Chicago's land values were shown as height on a relief map, the Loop would be equivalent to the peaks of the Himalayas compared to the rest of the city. In 1926, Chicago's central business district, which took up less than 1% of the city, had 20% of the city's land value. The same relationship was true in St. Louis in the mid-20s (20%) and Los Angeles in the early 1930s (17%). So when a downtown area started to shift its location, some property owners were bound to lose a great deal of money, while others would stand to gain.

=== Decentralization ===
One way in which downtown changed from the late 19th century to the early part of the 20th century was that industrial concerns began to leave downtown and move to the periphery of the city, which meant that downtown's businesses were chiefly part of the burgeoning service sector. Brand new firms followed the older ones, and never came to downtown, settling at the edges of the city or the urban area. Industrial districts developed in these areas, which were sometimes specifically zoned for manufacturing. There, land was considerably cheaper than downtown, property taxes were lower, transportation of supplies and finished products was much easier without the constant congestion emblematic of downtown, and with the improvement of the telephone system, the industrial firms could still keep in touch with the companies they did business with elsewhere. As a result of this migration, manufacturing was no longer a significant part of the downtown mix of businesses.

Another sector which began to move away from downtown even before the turn of the 20th century were the great cultural institutions: museums, symphony halls, main libraries and so on. Not only was the high cost of land downtown a factor, but these institutions wanted larger plots of land than were available there, so that their buildings could themselves be easily perceived as works of art. Organizations such as the Metropolitan Museum of Art, the New-York Historical Society, the American Museum of Natural History and the Museum of the City of New York, all in Manhattan, moved out of downtown, as did the Museum of Fine Arts, the Boston Public Library, the Boston Symphony Orchestra, and the Massachusetts Historical Society in Boston, the Cleveland Museum of Art, the Baltimore Museum of Art, the Detroit Public Library and the Detroit Institute of Art, and most of the cultural institutions in Pittsburgh. Public reaction to these moves was mixed, with some bemoaning the loss of a counterbalance to the overall materialism of downtown, while others, particularly those involved in real estate, looked positively on the availability of the land which the cultural institutions left behind.

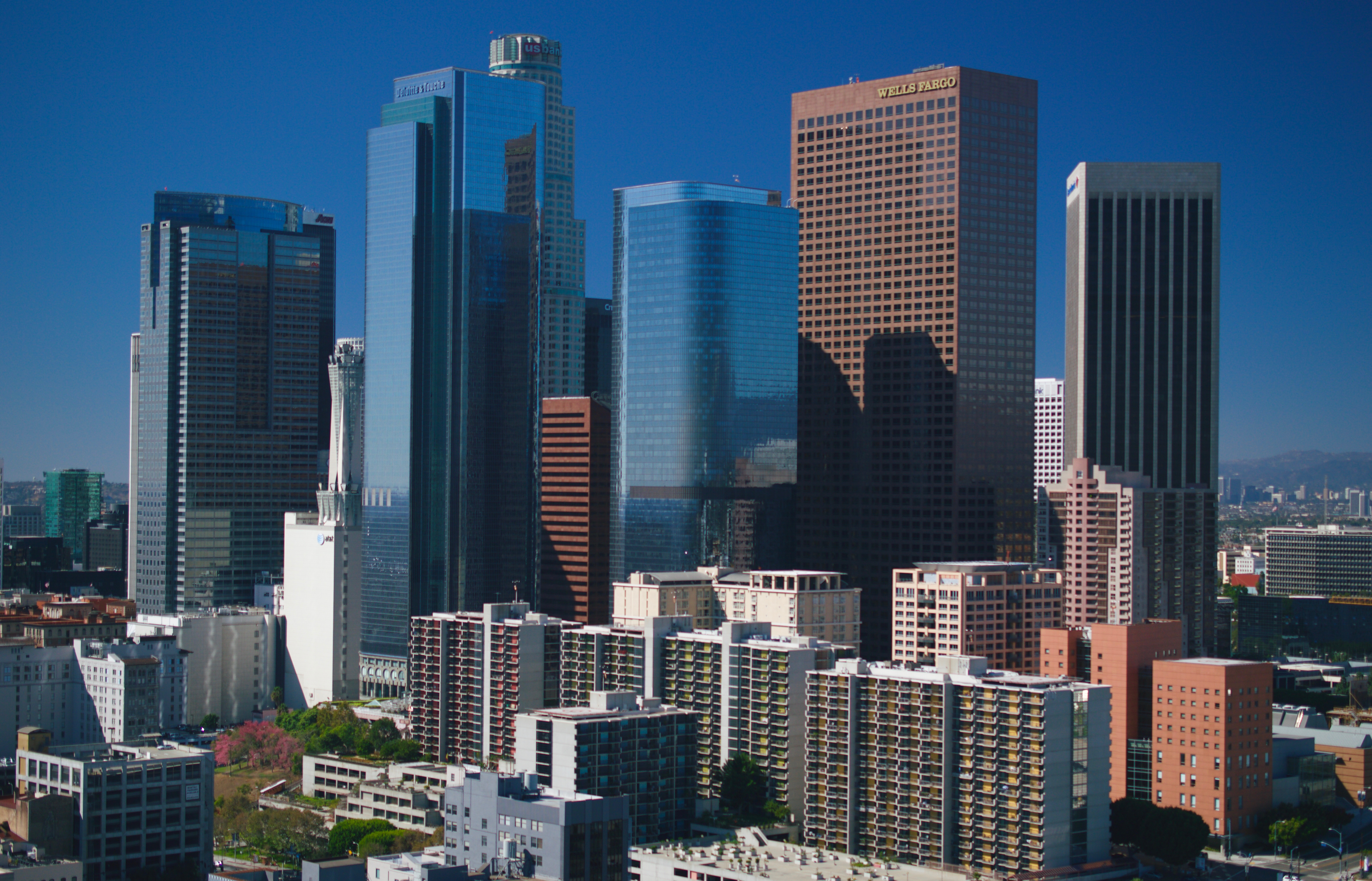
Downtown Los Angeles, the third-most populous downtown in the United States

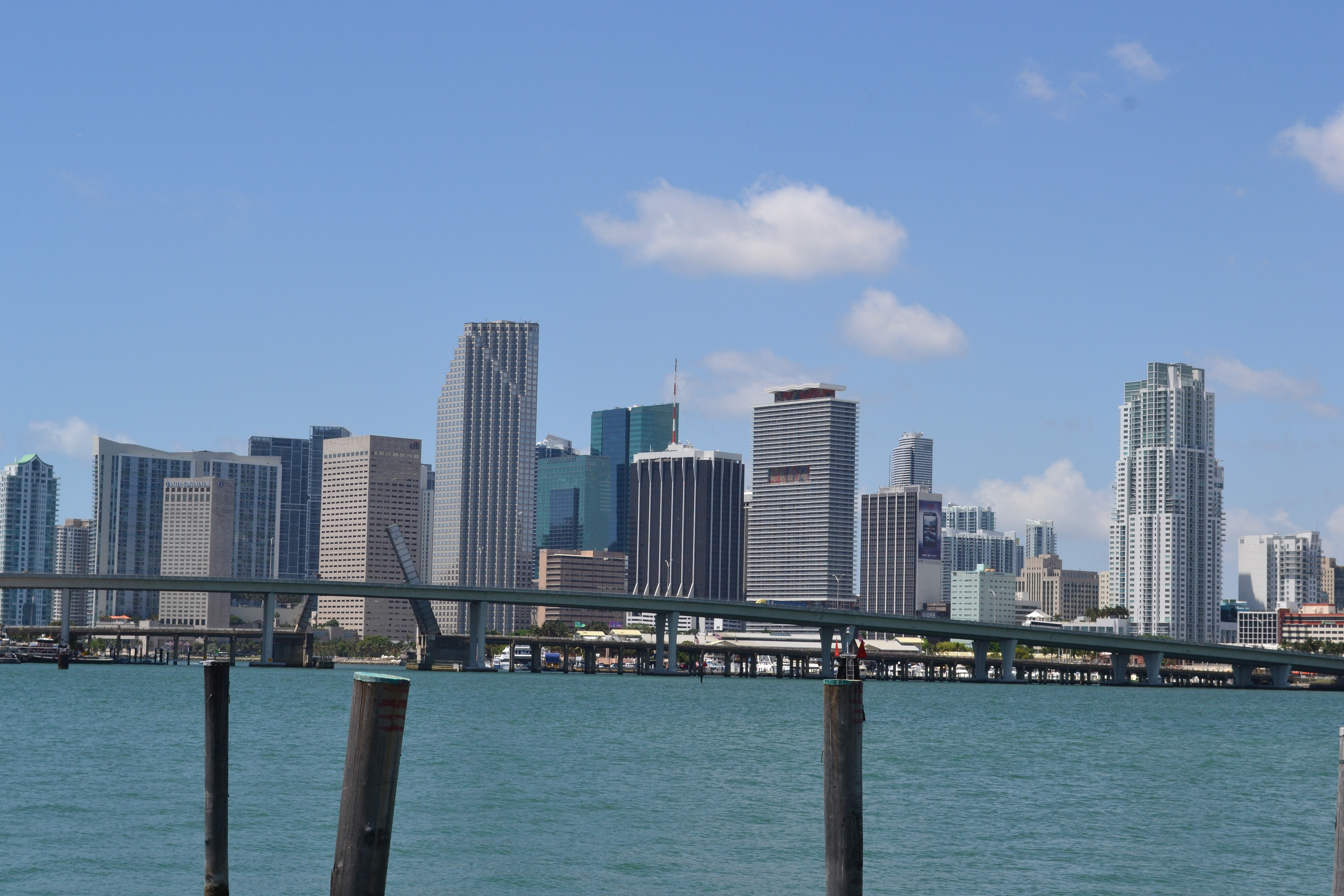
Downtown Miami

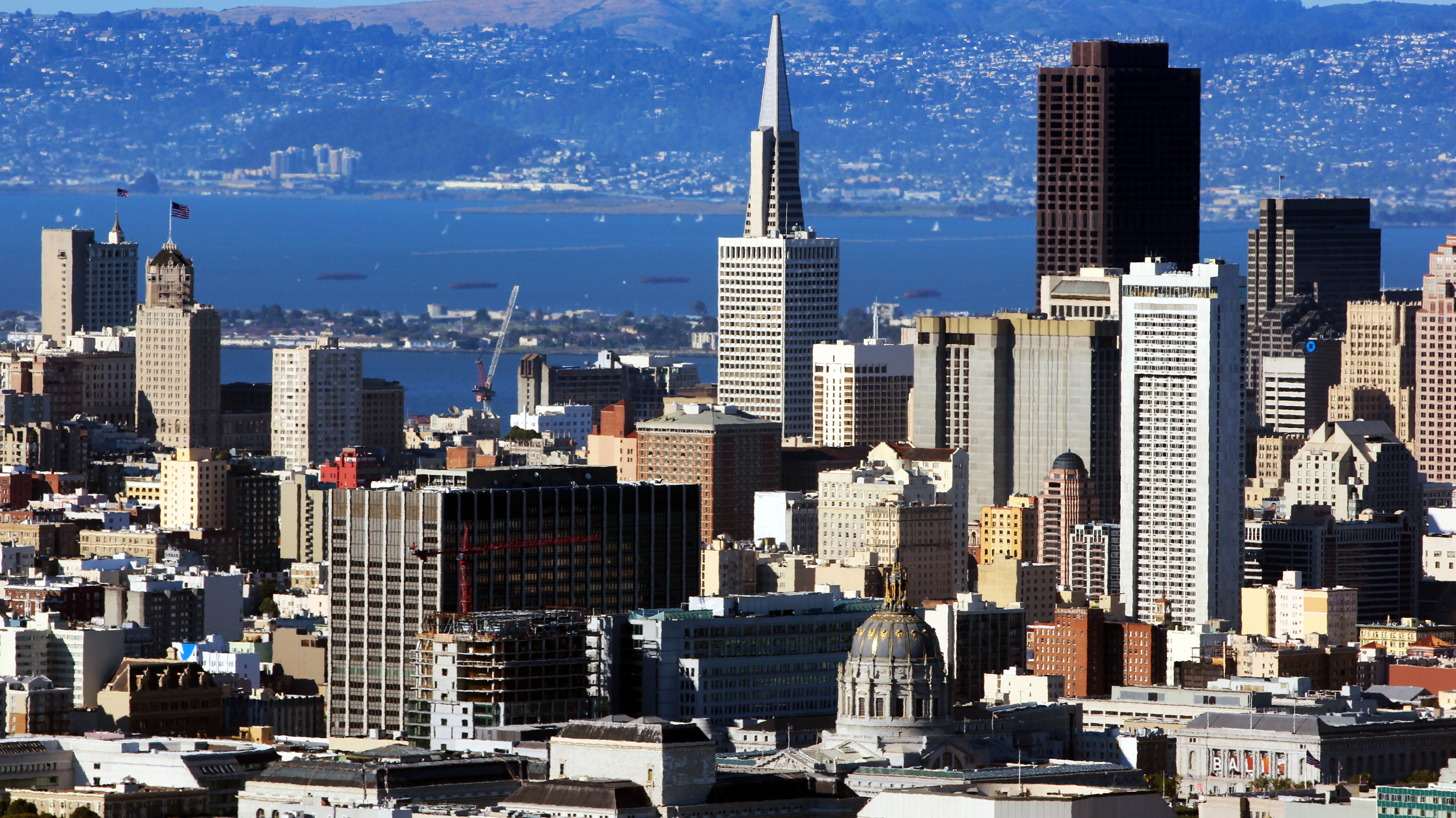
Downtown San Francisco

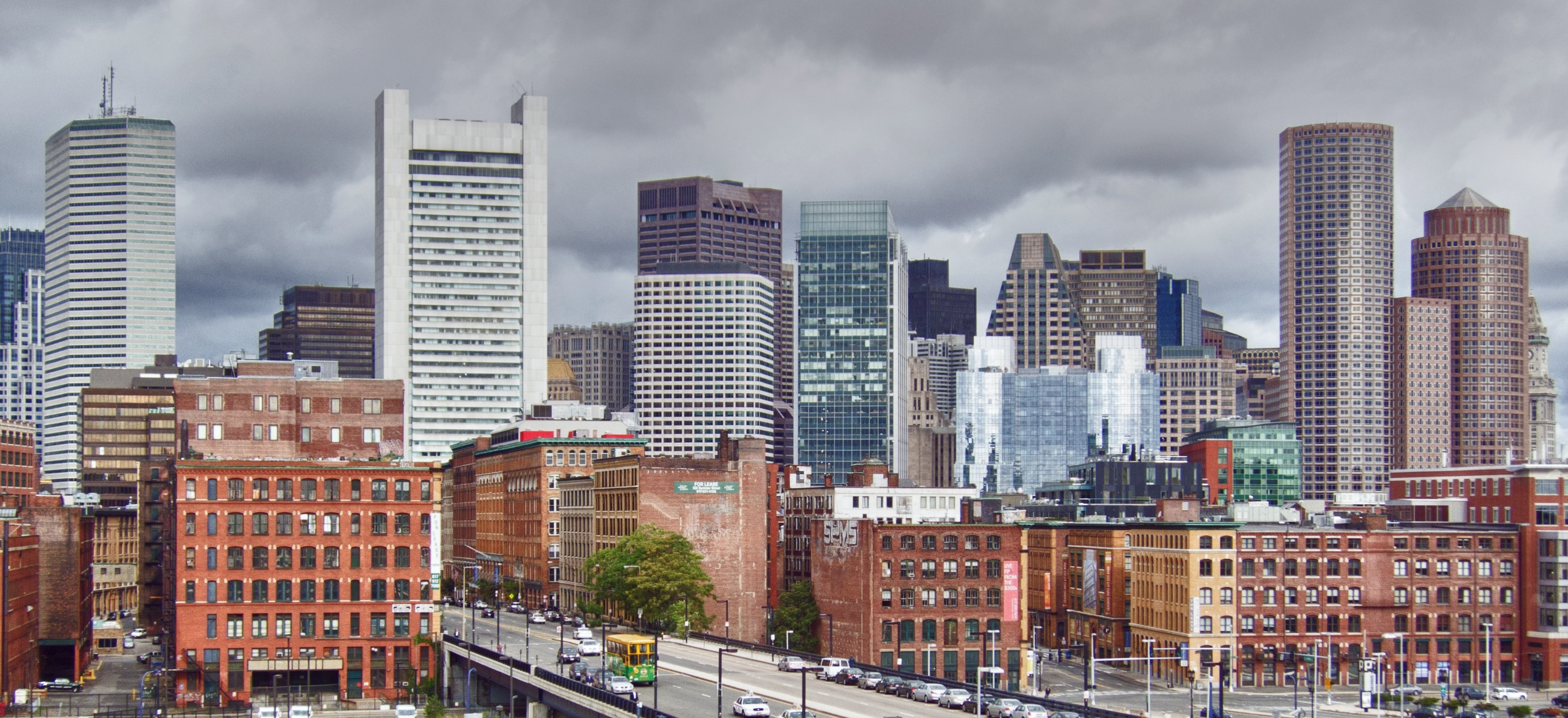
Downtown Boston

The loss of the major cultural institutions left downtown as a place primarily dedicated to business, but the loss of another sector, retail shopping, defined the type of business that was done there. The great retail outlets like the department stores had always had the tendency to move closer to the residential districts, to make it easier for their customers to get to them, but after 1920 they started to congregate in secondary business districts on the periphery of the city. The growth of chain stores such as J. C. Penney, F. W. Woolworth, Kresge and W. T. Grant, contributed to the increased importance of the outlying shopping districts, which began outselling those retail stores which had remained in the central business district, and provoked those stores to open branches in the secondary districts in attempt to go to where there customers were instead of having them come downtown to them.

Entertainment venues also contributed to the decentralization of commerce which affected the importance and influence of downtown and the central business district. Theaters, vaudeville houses, dance halls and night clubs had been primarily located in downtown, with nickelodeons spread throughout the city. When film became the dominant medium, and exhibitors started to build movie theaters to show them in, they at first built those venues downtown as well, but, as in retail shopping, chain exhibitors such as Loews began to construct them in locations convenient to the mass audience they were seeking; again, it was a matter of bringing their product to where the people were. By the late 1920s, movie houses outside of downtown far outnumbered those in the central district. Not all the movie theaters in the periphery were palaces, but some were, and the net effect was that downtown was no longer the entertainment center of the city.

With the loss of manufacturing, the major cultural institutions, much of the retail shopping in the city, and its loss of status as the entertainment center, the nature of downtown had changed considerably. It was still the location of banks, stocks and commodity exchanges, law and accounting firms, the headquarters of the major industrial concerns and public utilities, insurance companies, and advertising agencies, and in its confines continued to be built new and taller skyscrapers housing offices, hotels and even department stores, but it was still steadily losing ground as decentralization took its toll. Its daytime population was not keeping pace with the population growth of the city around it, and property values, while continuing to rise, were not rising as fast as those in the secondary business districts. Downtown was still the central business district, and was still the most important area for doing business and commerce, but it was no longer as dominant as it once was.

==== Cause and effect ====
The causes of decentralization, which decreased the importance of downtown in the life of American cities, have been ascribed to many factors, including each city's normal growth patterns; advances in technology like the telephone, which made it easier for business-to-business intercourse to take place over a distance, thus lessening the need for a centralized commercial core; the rise of the private automobile, which allowed shoppers to go to peripheral business districts more easily; a strong increase in streetcar fares; and the continuing problem of congestion in the narrow streets of the downtown area.

As much as people disagreed about what caused decentralization, they were even less in agreement about how decentralization would affect the central business district, with opinions varying all the way from the belief that it would diminish downtown sufficiently that it would eventually consist of only offices and the headquarters of corporate giants, to the belief that decentralization would lead to the (perhaps deserved) death of downtown entirely as unnecessary, a victim of its untameable traffic congestion. In between were those who saw a diminishment of the area's influence, but not enough to prevent it from remaining the "Sun" that the outlying business districts revolved around. Others doubted whether decentralization had as strong an impact as it was credited with. Positions were taken that downtown was a natural part of the evolution of a city, or the unnatural result of a de facto conspiracy by merchants and property owners, so the question of what decentralization would do to downtown became bound up with the question about the area's legitimacy.

Decentralization also increased the incidences of rivalry between downtown and burgeoning business districts. In Los Angeles, for instance, downtown and Wilshire Boulevard battled for dominance, and in Cincinnati the rivalry was between the old downtown centered around Fountain Square and the one on Canal Street. The diminishment of downtown by decentralization caused these battles to be between areas that were now more relatively equal.

=== The Great Depression ===
Like almost every other aspect of American life, the Great Depression had a major effect on the country's downtown area. Downtown was just coming off a major building boom, in which significant amounts of new commercial and office space, hotels, and department stores had been built. By 1931 there were 89 buildings of 30 stories or more in Manhattan, and between 1925 and 1931, office space nearly doubled; in Chicago, it increased by almost 75%, in Philadelphia by almost two-thirds, and by more than 50% in New Orleans and Denver. In the 1920s, 500,000 additional hotel rooms were built in New York, and from 1927 to 1931 there were 84 large hotels built there, an increase of hotel space by two-thirds.

When the boom was over, and the Depression had begun to have its effect, much of this new space became unneeded excess. Owners of smaller buildings who could not keep a sufficient number of tenants to pay their overhead, tore down their buildings, but whereas in the recent past they would have been replaced with taller buildings, now they became one- and two-story parking garages or ground-level parking lots. These were widely known as "taxpayers", as they generated enough revenue for the owner of the lot to pay the taxes on it. Rents fell, sometimes as much as 30%, and non-payment of rent increased. Even with the "taxpayers" taking away commercial space, vacancy rates rose precipitously. Owners went into default, and downtown real estate lost considerable value: 25–30% in the Chicago Loop – although values in other parts of the city, including the outlying business districts, fared even worse.

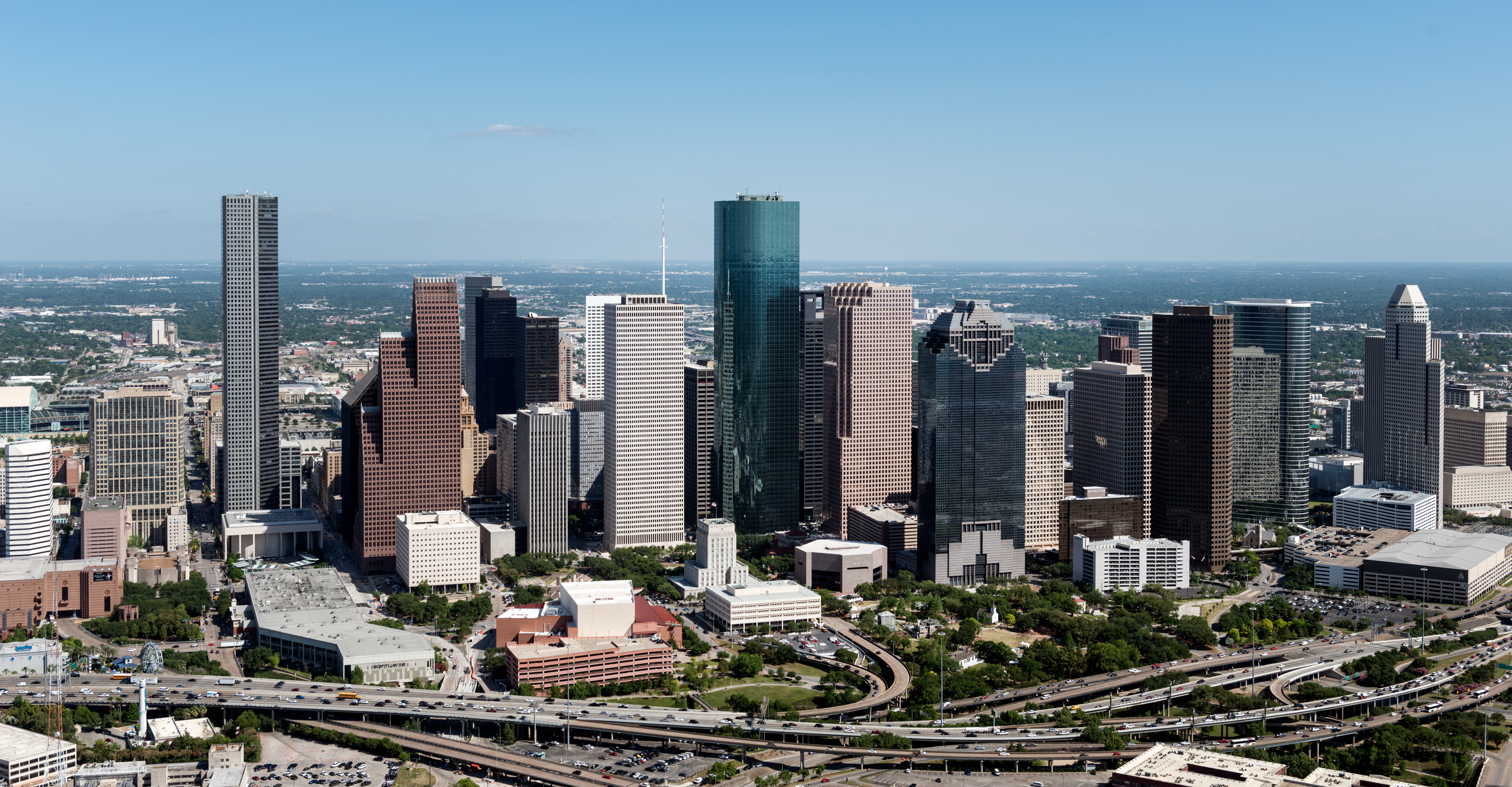
Downtown Houston

Timelapse video of Downtown Seattle from atop a Community Transit double-decker bus

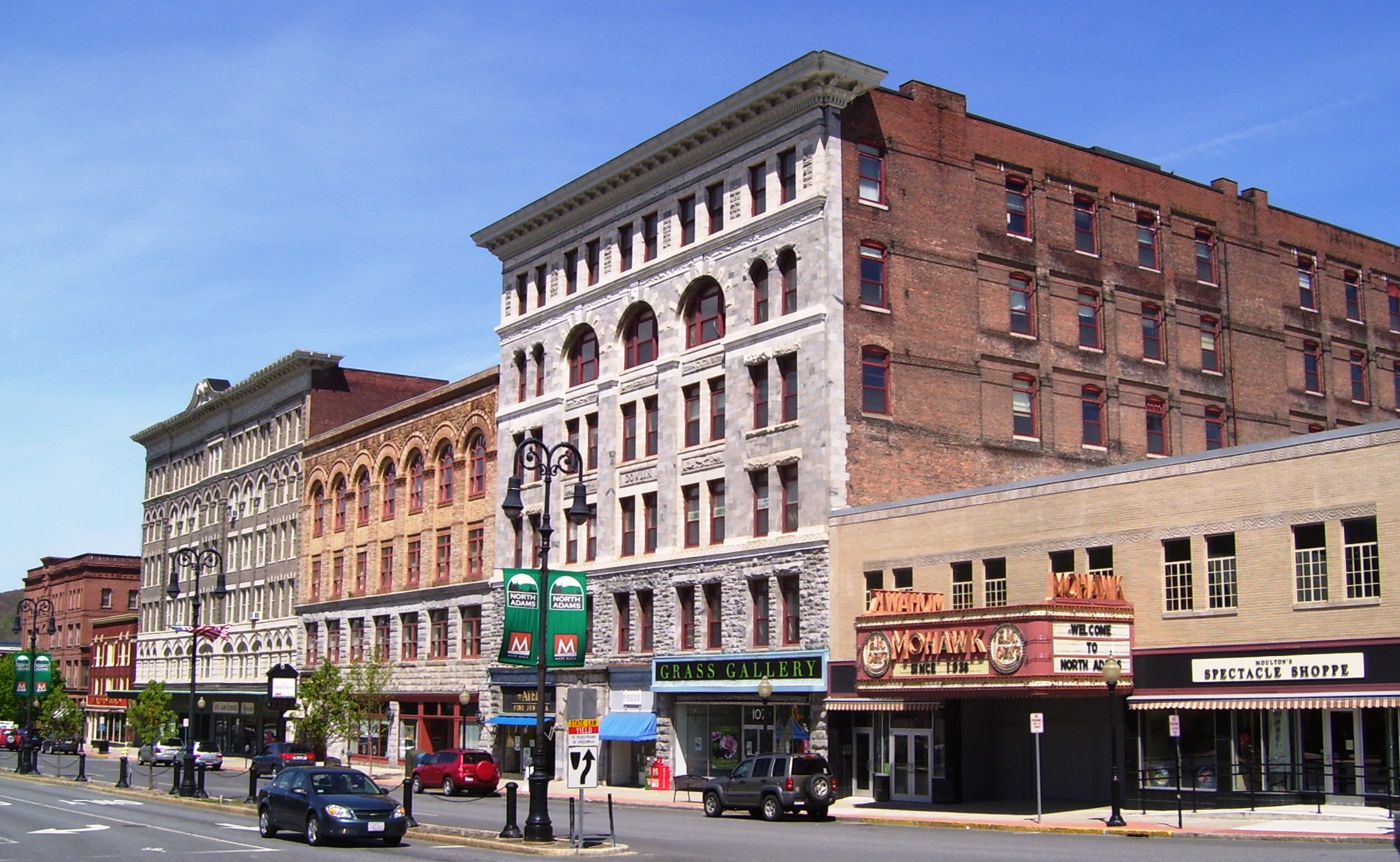
Downtown North Adams, Massachusetts, population 13,000. This scale and style is typical of many small cities in the United States and Canada.

Department stores were hit hard; most managed to keep their doors open, but few made money. Hotels which needed to have large staffs, and required high occupancy rates to make a profit were also deeply affected; in Manhattan the hotel occupancy rate fell from 1929's 70% to around 50% in 1933. Room rates were slashed, revenue dropped, and many hotels closed or defaulted. By 1934, 80% of hotels in Manhattan were owned by their creditors.

=== Recovery ===
The slow recovery from the effects of the Great Depression began in the mid-1930s, decelerated at the end of the 1930s, and picked up speed with the start of World War II, so that by the early 1940s the country was for the most part out of the Depression. Excess commercial space began to be used, vacancy rates dropped, department store sales rose, hotel occupancy rates went up, and revenues increased.

Despite this recovery, the daytime population of the country's downtowns did not rebound. For instance, in Chicago between 1929 and 1949, the population of the city grew 7%, and that of the entire metropolitan area by about 14%, but the daytime population of The Loop only rose 1/3 of 1%. With a few exceptions, such as New York City, this pattern was typical across American cities, and was tied to the slowing down of the rate of growth of the cities themselves. Cities in the US grew much more slowly than during any other period in the history of the country, and some even lost population. Metropolitan regions grew faster than the cities inside them, indicating the start of the decades of urban sprawl, but they too grew at a slower pace than usual. Downtowns also had less daytime population because people now went to the outlying business districts, which were closer to their homes by car, for their shopping and entertainment, to do business, and to work. The increased use of automobiles over mass transit also damaged downtown, since the streetcar lines converged on downtown, while the roads went everywhere. All of these factors contributed to the lesser recovery of downtown relative to the city as a whole and the metropolitan area.

Another sign that downtowns were no longer as central to city life as they once were include the decreased portion of retail trade that took place there as compared to the peripheral business areas, which profited by the growth of the chain stores, to the detriment of the big downtown department stores. Furthermore, the "taxpayers", which many people had expected to disappear once the economy improved, remained in place, and even increased in number. In the Loop in Chicago, by the early 1940s, 18% of the land was vacant or was used for parking; in Los Angeles at the same time, the figure was 25%. Demand for commercial space was so light that it did not make financial sense to construct expensive new buildings, and banks began to refuse to make loans for that purpose, redlining whole neighborhoods in the central business district.

== Characteristics ==
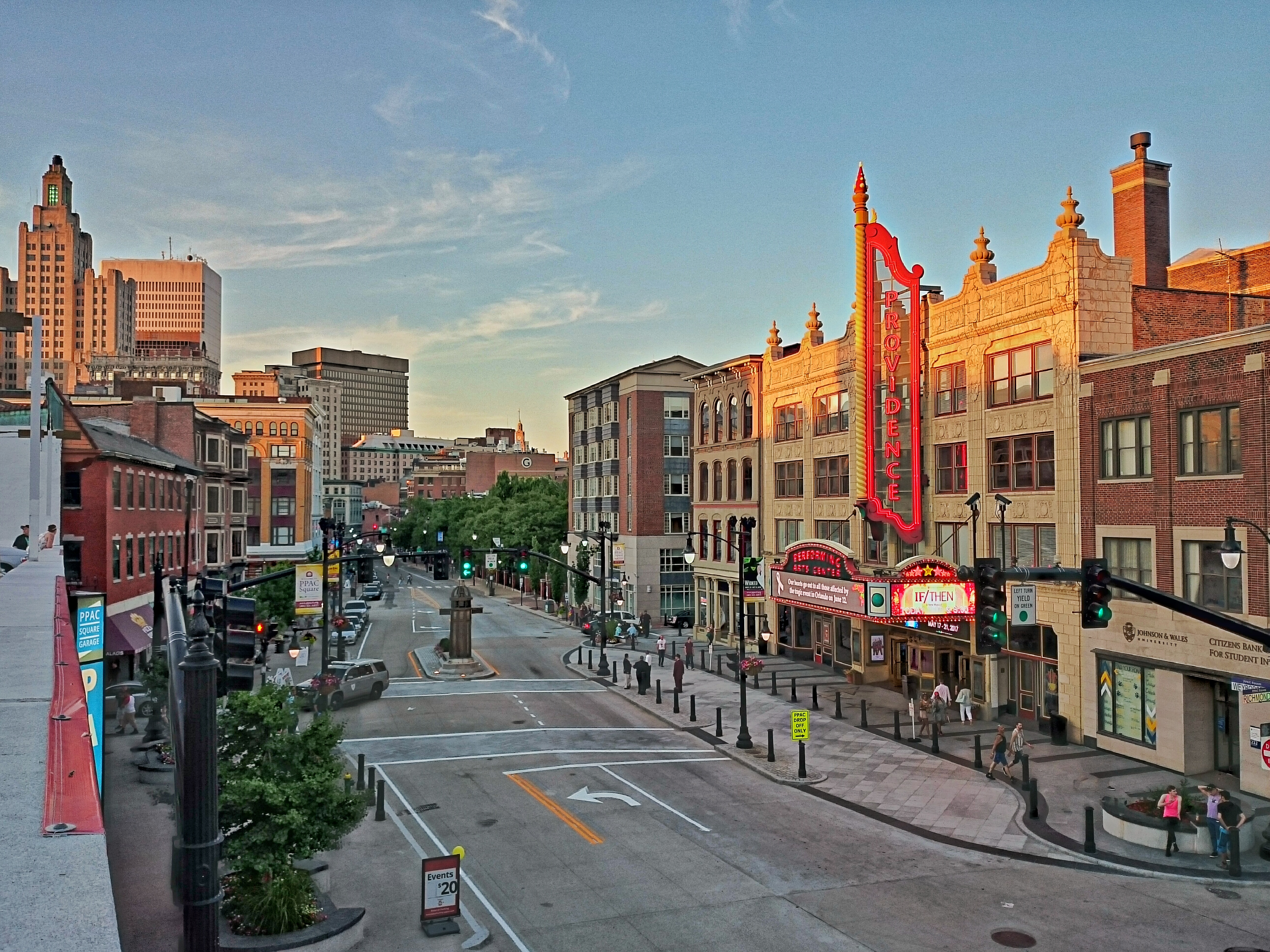
Downtown Providence, Rhode Island, a typical mid-sized American city

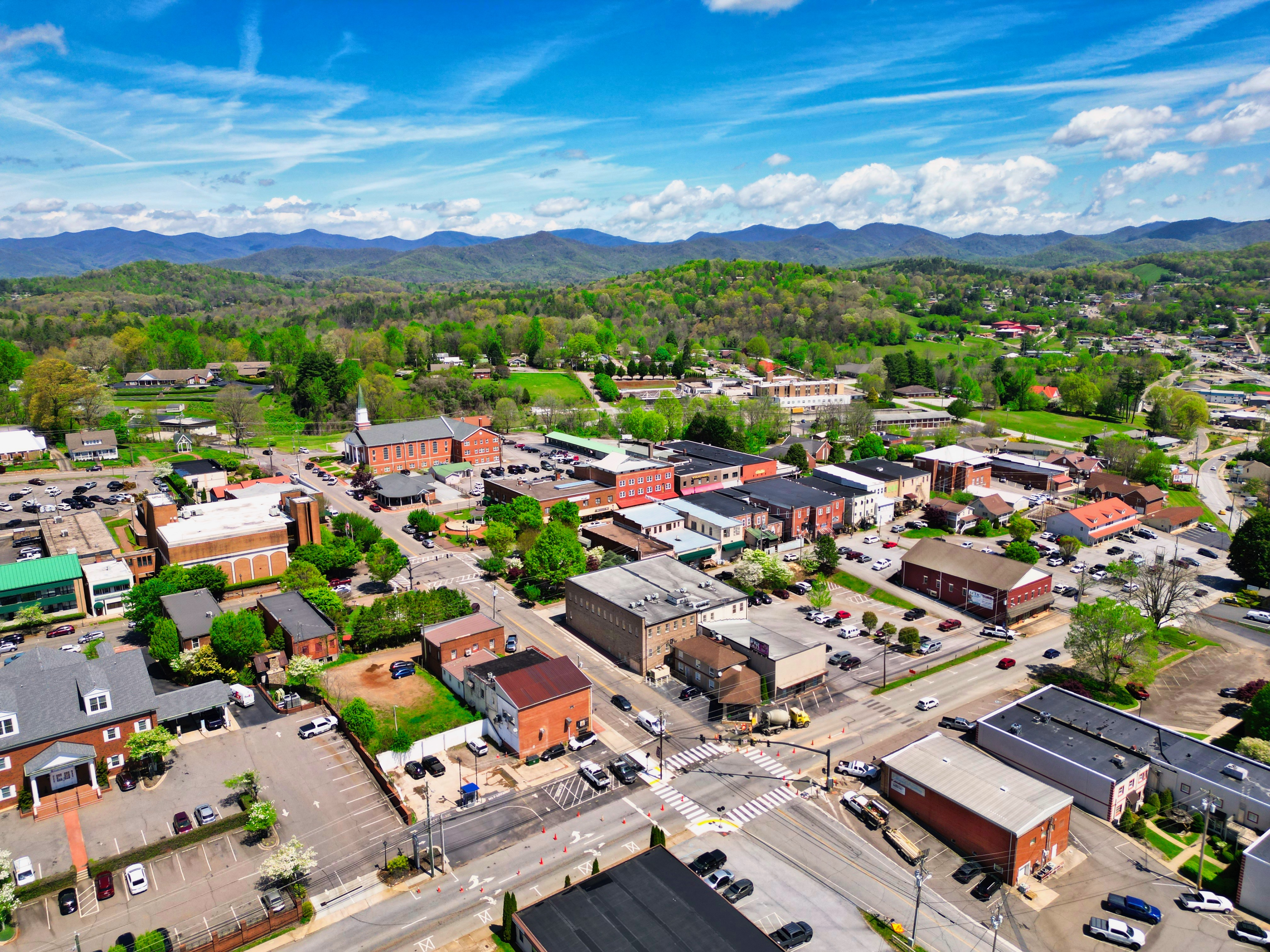
Aerial view of downtown Franklin, North Carolina, a small American town

A typical American downtown has certain unique characteristics. During the postwar economic boom in the 1950s, the residential population of most downtowns crashed. This has been attributed to reasons such as slum clearance, construction of the Interstate Highway System, and white flight from urban cores to rapidly expanding suburbs. Due to well-intended but ineptly executed urban revitalization projects, downtowns eventually came to be dominated by high-rise office buildings in which commuters from the suburbs filled white-collar jobs, while the remaining residential populations sank further into unemployment, poverty, and homelessness. By the 1990s, many office-oriented businesses began to abandon the downtowns for the suburbs, resulting in what are now known as "edge cities". One textbook, in explaining why edge cities are so popular, stated:

The big central city comes with dirt, crime, subways, stress, congestion, high taxes, and poor public schools. Edge cities are not immune to all of these problems (especially congestion) but for now they largely avoid most of them.

Since then, between 2000 and 2010, downtown areas grew rapidly in population. In U.S. metro areas with at least five million people, the population within two miles of the city hall grew twice as fast as the overall population in the metro area.

== Relative geography ==
The terms downtown and uptown can refer to cardinal directions, for example, in Manhattan, where downtown is also a relative geographical term. Anything south of where the speaker is currently standing, in most places, is said to be downtown. Anything north of the speaker is uptown. In the common New York City phrase "We're going to take the subway downtown", downtown refers to traveling in the geographic direction of south. A person standing on 121st Street and walking ten blocks south could also be said to have walked ten blocks downtown. The term uptown is used to refer to the cardinal direction north. Such concepts derive from Manhattan's elongated shape, running roughly north–south and nowhere more than 2 mi (3.2 km) wide. As such, transportation on the island travels in the uptown/downtown directions. The other boroughs are wider, and "downtown" there refers to Lower Manhattan, Downtown Brooklyn, or some more local business district. Mercantile efforts to promote the South Bronx as "Downtown Bronx" have met with little success.

In some North American cities, downtown is the formal name of the neighborhood in which the city's central business district is located. Most major North American cities are located on major bodies of water, like oceans, lakes, and rivers. As cities expanded, people built further away from the water and their historical cores, often uphill. Thus the central business district of a North American city, or the historical core of the city, is often located "down", in altitude, relative to the remainder of the city. Many cities use the Manhattan model and continue to use downtown, midtown, and uptown both as informal relative geographical terms and as formal names for distinct districts. However, the city of Philadelphia uses the designation Center City, not downtown, due to the business district's central location, as well as Philadelphia's age and circumstances; "Center City" corresponds to the City of Philadelphia prior to its amalgamation with Philadelphia County in 1854, leaving it without a unique name, unlike the former boroughs surrounding it; the center of the city is also where Philadelphia City Hall is located within the city's original plat. New Orleans uses the term Central Business District (or CBD) for its downtown due to the French Quarter and other historic neighborhoods downriver from the CBD being referred to as "downtown".

== Major downtowns ==
United States
(50 most populous American cities)

- Downtown Albuquerque
- Downtown Arlington, Texas
- Downtown Atlanta
- Downtown Austin
- Downtown Baltimore
- Downtown Boston
- Financial District, Boston
- Uptown Charlotte
- Chicago Loop
- Downtown Colorado Springs
- Downtown Columbus
- Downtown Denver
- Downtown Detroit

- Downtown Dallas
- Downtown El Paso
- Downtown Fort Worth
- Downtown Fresno
- Downtown Houston
- Downtown Indianapolis
- Downtown Jacksonville
- Downtown Kansas City
- Downtown Las Vegas
- Downtown Long Beach
- Downtown Los Angeles
- Downtown Louisville
- Downtown Memphis
- Downtown Mesa

- Downtown Miami
- Downtown Milwaukee
- Downtown Minneapolis
- Downtown Nashville
- Downtown New Orleans
- Midtown Manhattan, New York City
- Financial District, New York City
- Downtown Brooklyn, New York City
- Downtown Oakland
- Downtown Oklahoma City
- Downtown Omaha
- Center City, Philadelphia
- Downtown Phoenix
- Downtown Portland
- Downtown Raleigh

- Downtown Sacramento
- Downtown St. Louis
- Downtown Saint Paul
- Downtown San Antonio
- Downtown San Diego
- Downtown San Francisco
- Downtown San Jose
- Downtown Seattle
- Downtown Tampa
- Downtown Tucson
- Downtown Tulsa
- Downtown Virginia Beach
- Downtown, Washington, D.C.
- Downtown Wichita

Canada

- Downtown Calgary
- Downtown Edmonton
- Downtown Halifax
- Downtown London
- Downtown Montreal
- Downtown Ottawa
- Downtown St. John's
- Downtown Toronto
- Downtown Vancouver
- Downtown Victoria
- Downtown Winnipeg

Downtowns in Canada

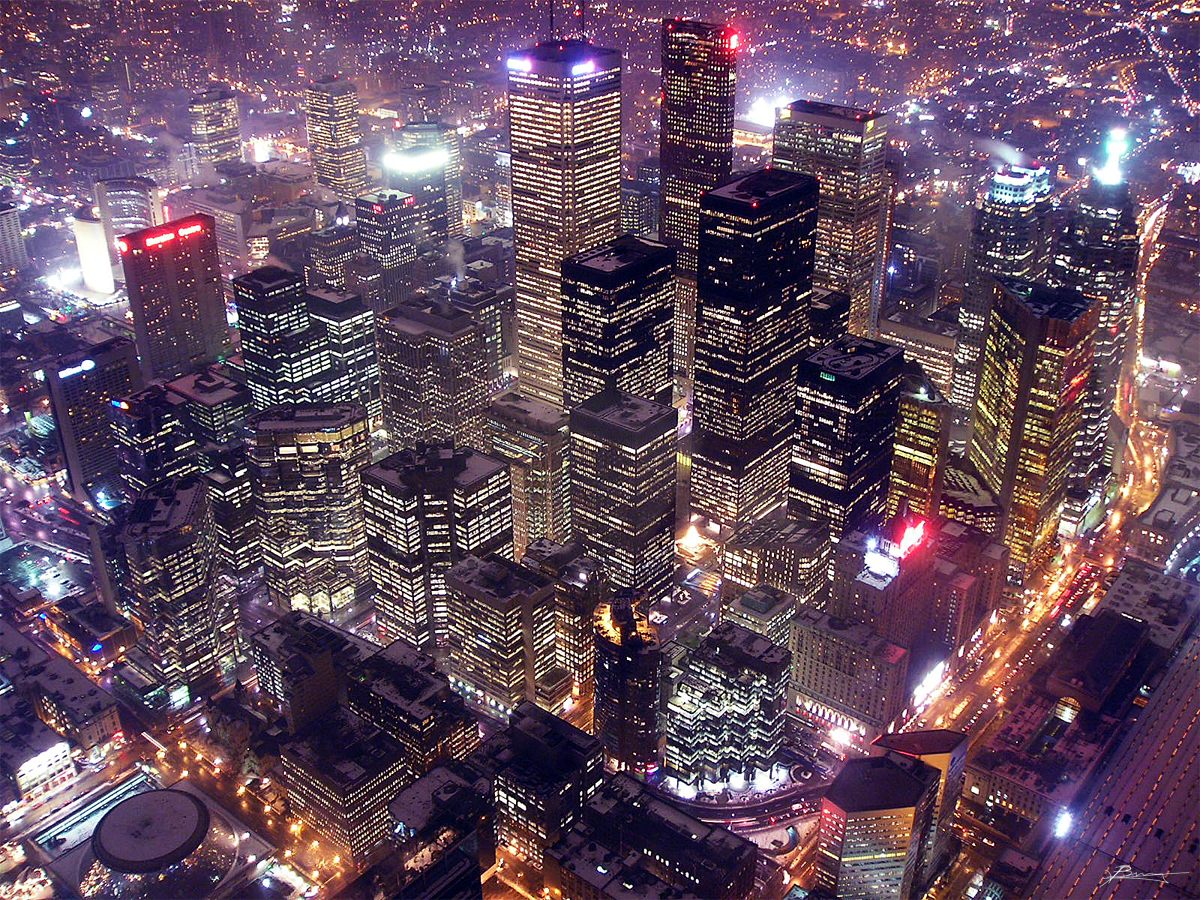
Downtown Toronto, Ontario

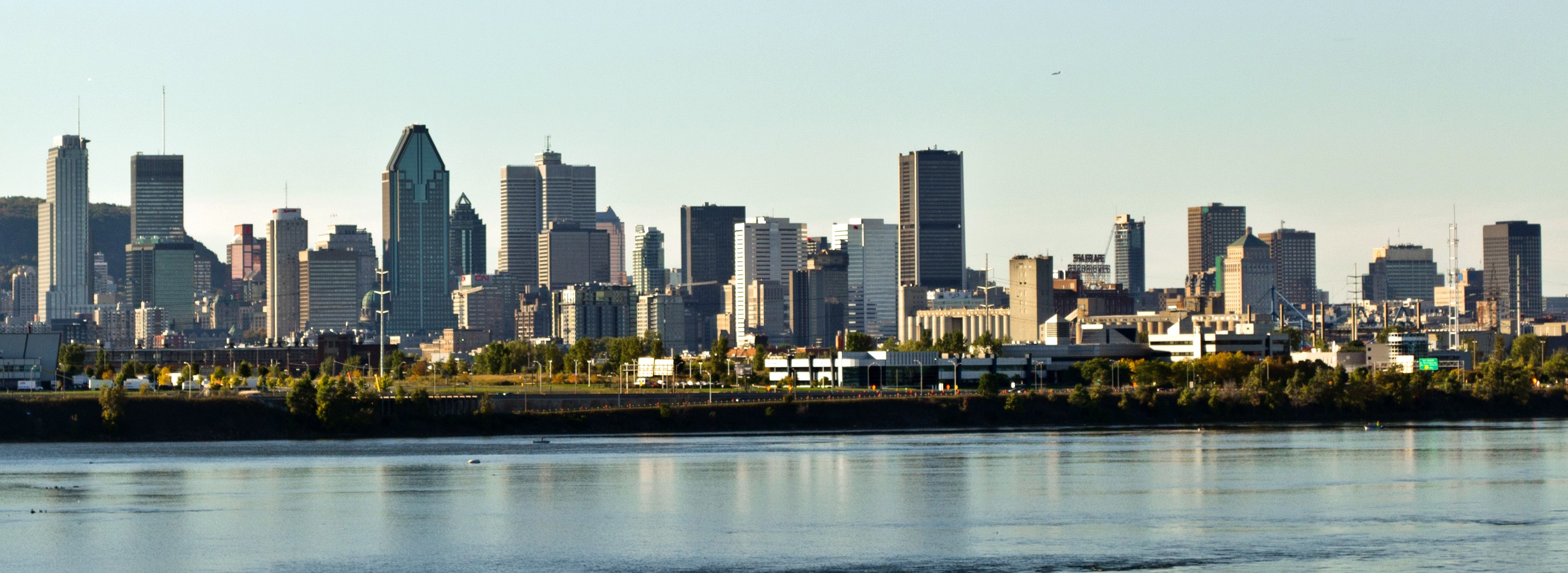
Downtown Montreal, Quebec

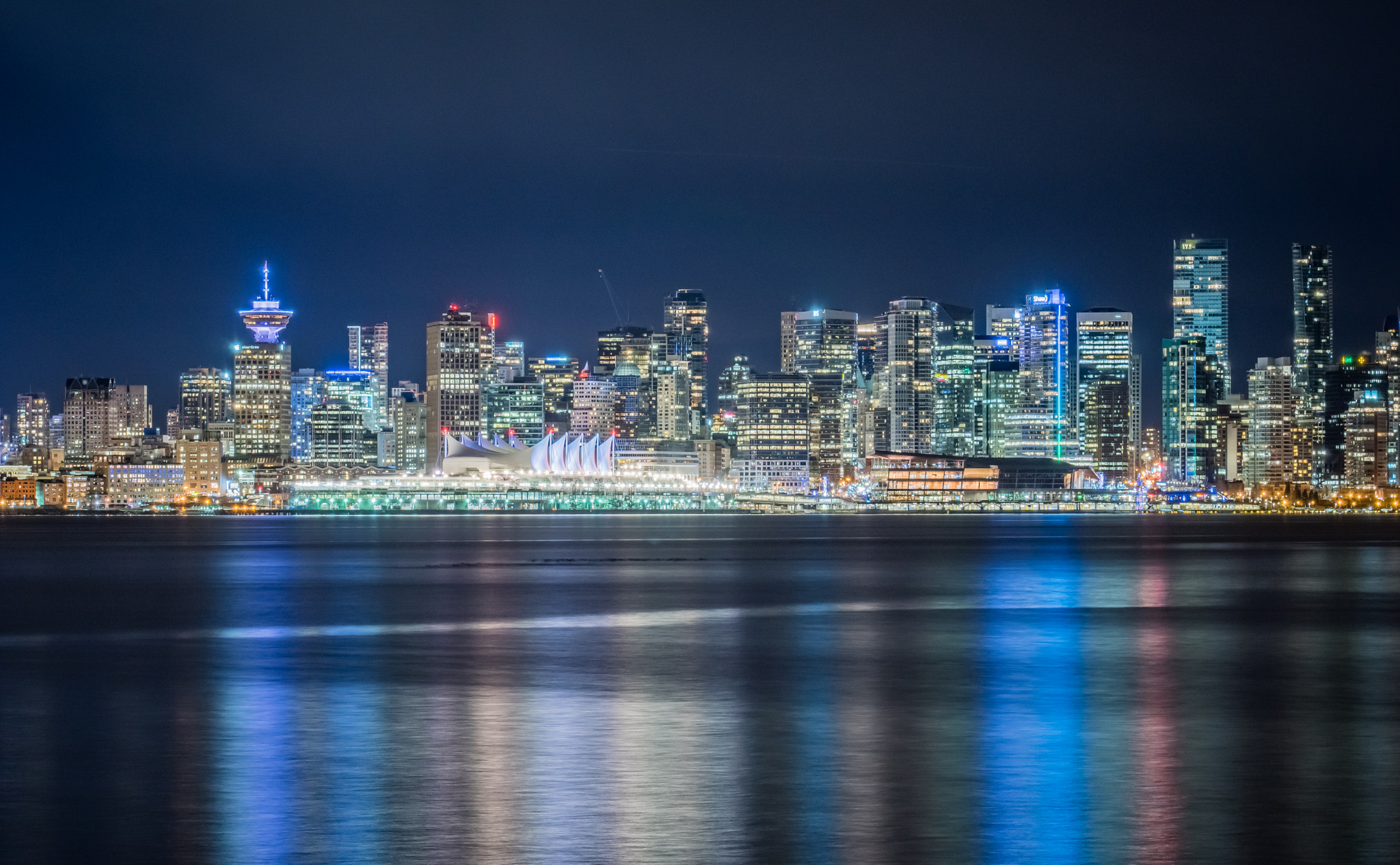
Downtown Vancouver, British Columbia

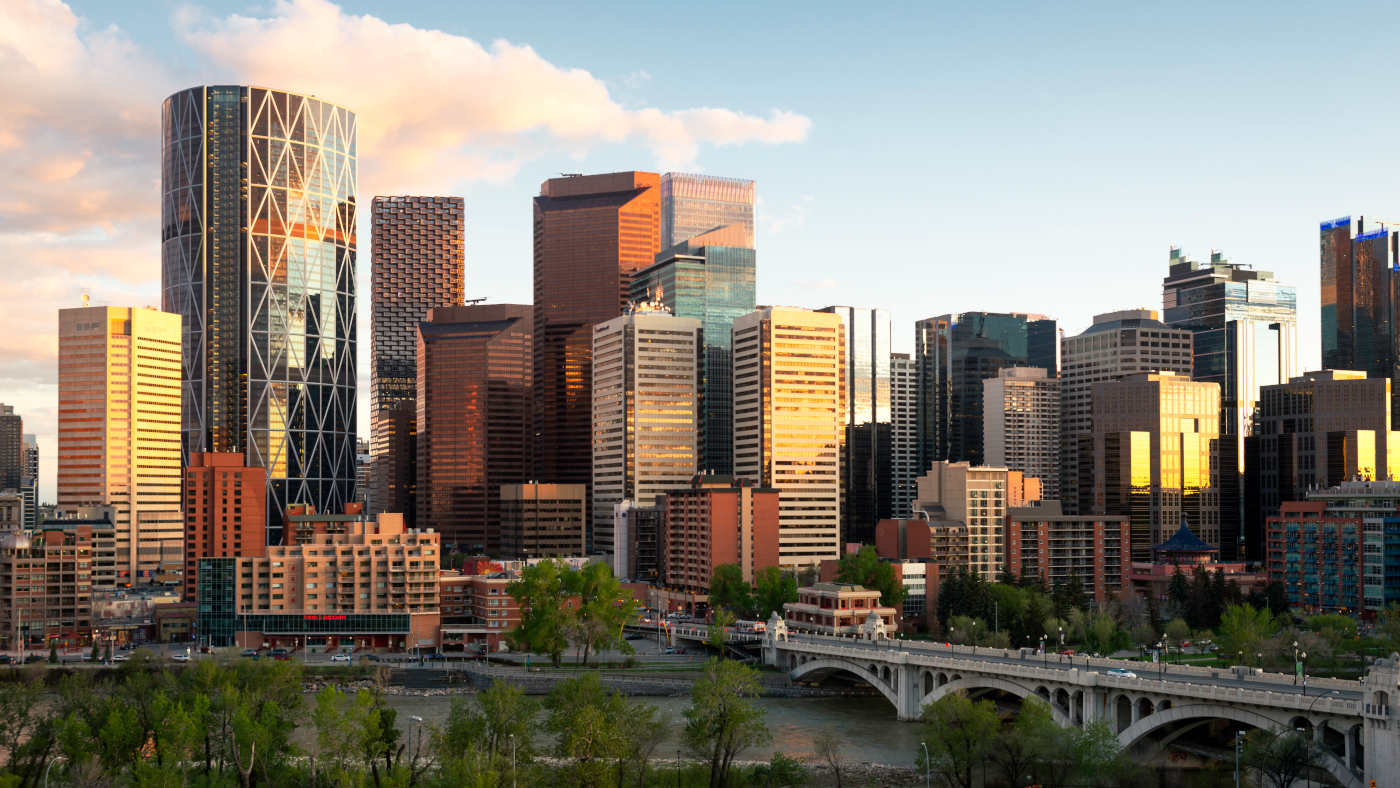
Downtown Calgary, Alberta

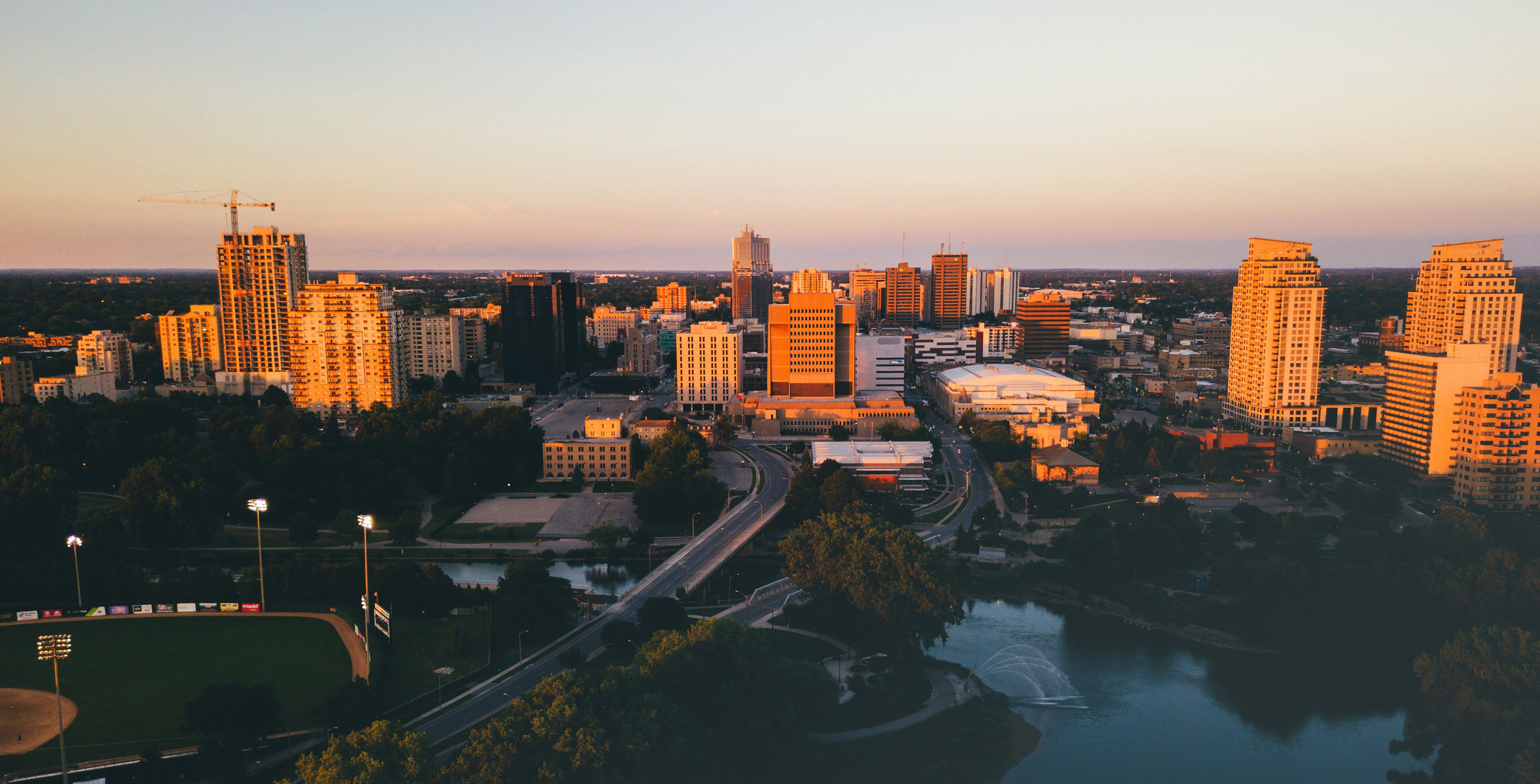
Downtown London, Ontario

== See also ==
- Concentric zone model
- High Street
- Inner city
- Main Street
- Urbanization

== Bibliography ==
- Fogelson, Robert M. (2003). Downtown: Its Rise and Fall, 1880–1950. New Haven, Connecticut: Yale University Press. ISBN 978-0-300-09827-3.
