= Scott Cowen =

Professor and academic administrator (born 1946)

Scott S. Cowen
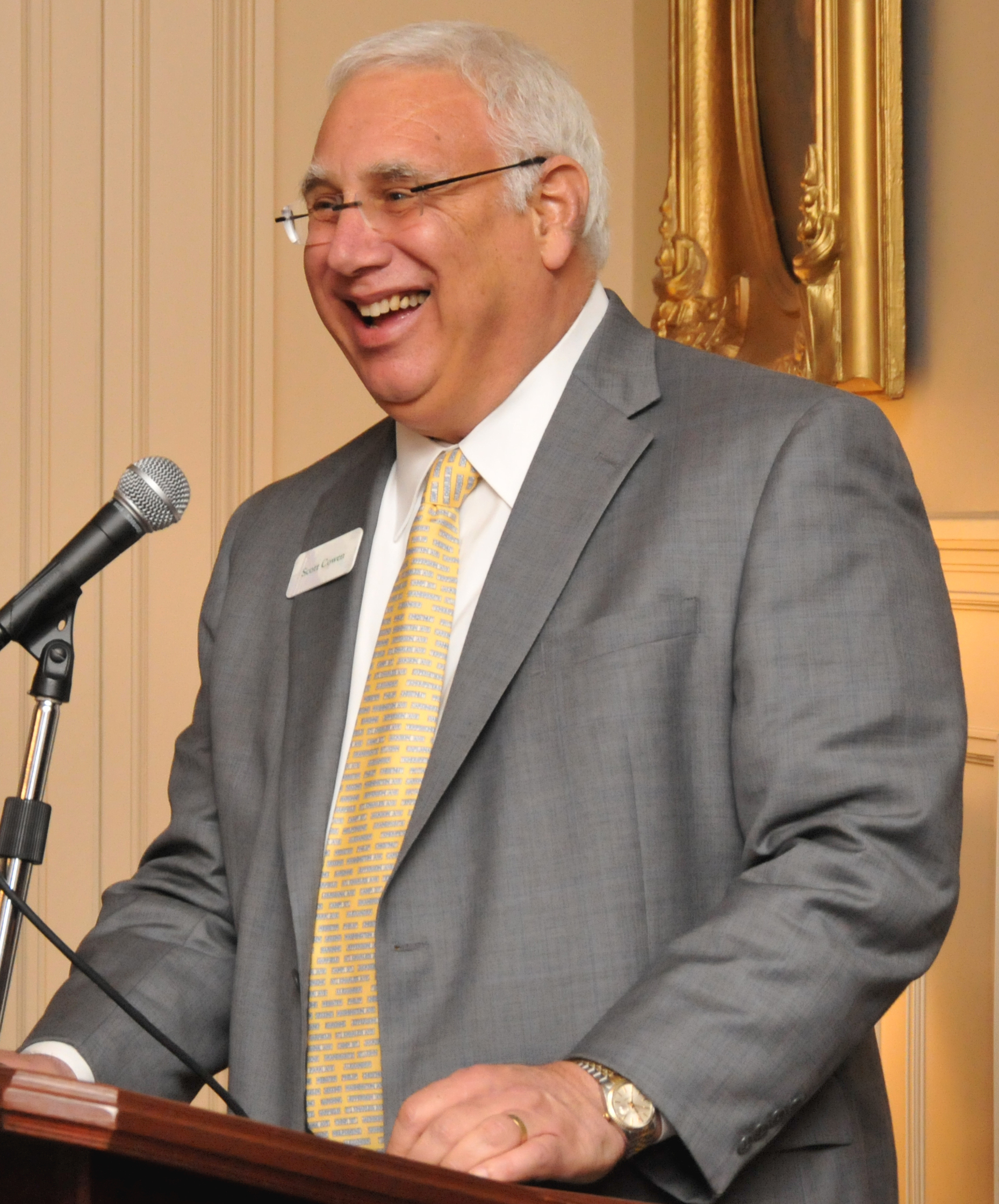
- Cowen in 2009
- Born: July 27, 1946 (age 80); Metuchen, New Jersey, U.S.
- Education: University of Connecticut; George Washington University
- Known for: Tulane University president Business professor Prolific author Interim President Of Case Western Reserve
- Scientific career
- Fields: Economics, Finance and Accounting
- Workplaces: Tulane University; Case Western Reserve University

Scott S. Cowen (born 27 July 1946) is president emeritus of Tulane University in New Orleans, Louisiana, where he was also Seymour S. Goodman Memorial Professor in the A.B. Freeman School of Business and professor of economics in Tulane's School of Liberal Arts. He was interim president of Case Western Reserve University in Cleveland, Ohio from 2020 to 2021, and currently serves as Distinguished Presidential Visiting Professor of Leadership and Management at CWRU. He has written more than a hundred peer-reviewed journal articles and five books. His most recent book, Winnebagos on Wednesdays: How Visionary Leadership Can Transform Higher Education, was published by Princeton University Press in 2018. Cowen is the eponym of Tulane's Cowen Institute and chairs its board of advisors. Cowen served as Tulane's 14th president from July 1998 through June 2014.

== Background ==
Son of Helen Cowen and Stanley Cowen, Scott Cowen finished his secondary education at Metuchen High School, New Jersey. Upon graduation in 1964 he was cited as "the student who had done the most" for Metuchen High. In 2016 Cowen was inducted into the inaugural Metuchen High School Hall of Fame.

Cowen was recruited by Lou Holtz to play football for the University of Connecticut, where later-legendary Holtz was briefly serving as an assistant coach. After receiving his Bachelor of Science degree from UConn in 1968, Cowen entered the United States Army Infantry Officer Candidate School and served for three years as an infantry officer. He was assigned to the Army Security Agency where he spent a tour of duty in the Middle East. On discharge he enrolled in George Washington University, where he received his master of business administration (MBA) in finance and doctor of business administration (DBA) in finance and management. After a brief stint as an instructor at Bucknell University, he began a 23-year career starting as an assistant professor and finished as dean and Albert J. Weatherhead Professor of Management in the Weatherhead School of Management at Case Western Reserve University.

Cowen chaired the Posse Foundation’s New Orleans Advisory Board and is a former director of several public and private companies including, most recently, American Greetings, Barnes & Noble, Forest City Realty Trust, and Newell Brands. He is the current board chairman of Parkwood Corporation, a senior advisor to the Boston Consulting Group, and serves on a number of nonprofit boards, including Case Western Reserve University, the Mt. Sinai Health Foundation, the Weatherhead Foundation, and the Mandel Foundation. Cowen also served as an overseer of TIAA-CREF, a member of the Knight Commission on Intercollegiate Athletics, and is a trustee emeritus of the University of Notre Dame. He is a former president of the Association to Advance Collegiate Schools of Business (AACSB) and former chair of the Association of American Universities.

In February 2018, Cowen published his most recent book, Winnebagos on Wednesdays. Princeton University Press. 2018. ISBN 9780691174617.

== President of Tulane ==
Prior to Hurricane Katrina in 2005, Cowen was known in higher education as a supporter of reform in the National Collegiate Athletic Association (NCAA) to bolster academics involving athletes and also to open Bowl Championship Series (BCS) eligibility to teams in conferences such as Conference USA (C-USA) to which Tulane belonged. Cowen supported efforts "to get rid of the BCS and go to a playoff system."

=== Hurricane Katrina ===
Hurricane Katrina and flood waters resulting from the levee's failures hit Tulane's uptown and downtown campuses shortly after the start of the 2005 fall semester. Cowen led Tulane through a rebuilding and academic reorganization, during which the decision to merge and eliminate Newcomb College's quasi-selfstanding character wholly into Tulane was criticized, as was also the decision to eliminate several departments in the School of Engineering and merge its remaining departments with the science departments in the School of Liberal Arts and Sciences. This resulted in a new School of Science and Engineering as well as a new undergraduate college, Newcomb-Tulane College, and a restructured School of Liberal Arts. At the same time, Tulane became the first and only major private research university to incorporate public service into its core curriculum.

Cowen was critical of the Federal Emergency Management Agency (FEMA) and the State of Louisiana for their handling of Katrina recovery. In the plans to reconstruct New Orleans' Charity Hospital, Cowen's defended the need for Tulane Medical Center's representation on Charity's board, which resulted in the Louisiana State University System to depart from earlier plans to monopolize the board appointments and instead to seek accommodation with Tulane, Xavier University of Louisiana, and three other institutions in Orleans Parish (Dillard University, Southern University at New Orleans, and Delgado Community College).

Cowen was appointed to the city's Bring New Orleans Back Commission and charged with leading a committee to reform and rebuild the city's failing public school system. This assignment led to the creation of a new institute at Tulane focused on advancing public education and youth success. Cowen also is a co-founder of the Fleur-de-lis Ambassadors program, a group of New Orleans civic leaders dedicated to spreading the message nationwide that post-Katrina New Orleans is an economically viable, livable city with a recovery plan in progress, and was a commissioner of the New Orleans Redevelopment Authority and the New Orleans Public Belt Railroad.

=== Continuing challenges ===
In 2009 Cowen represented Louisiana's 10 private colleges and universities when he testified in the Louisiana legislature against a bill that provided for concealed weapons on campuses.

In 2010, both before and after the Deepwater Horizon oil spill disaster in the Gulf of Mexico, Cowen testified, successfully, in the Commerce Committee of the Louisiana senate, against a bill by State Senator Robert Adley to terminate funding for the Tulane University Environmental Law Clinic.

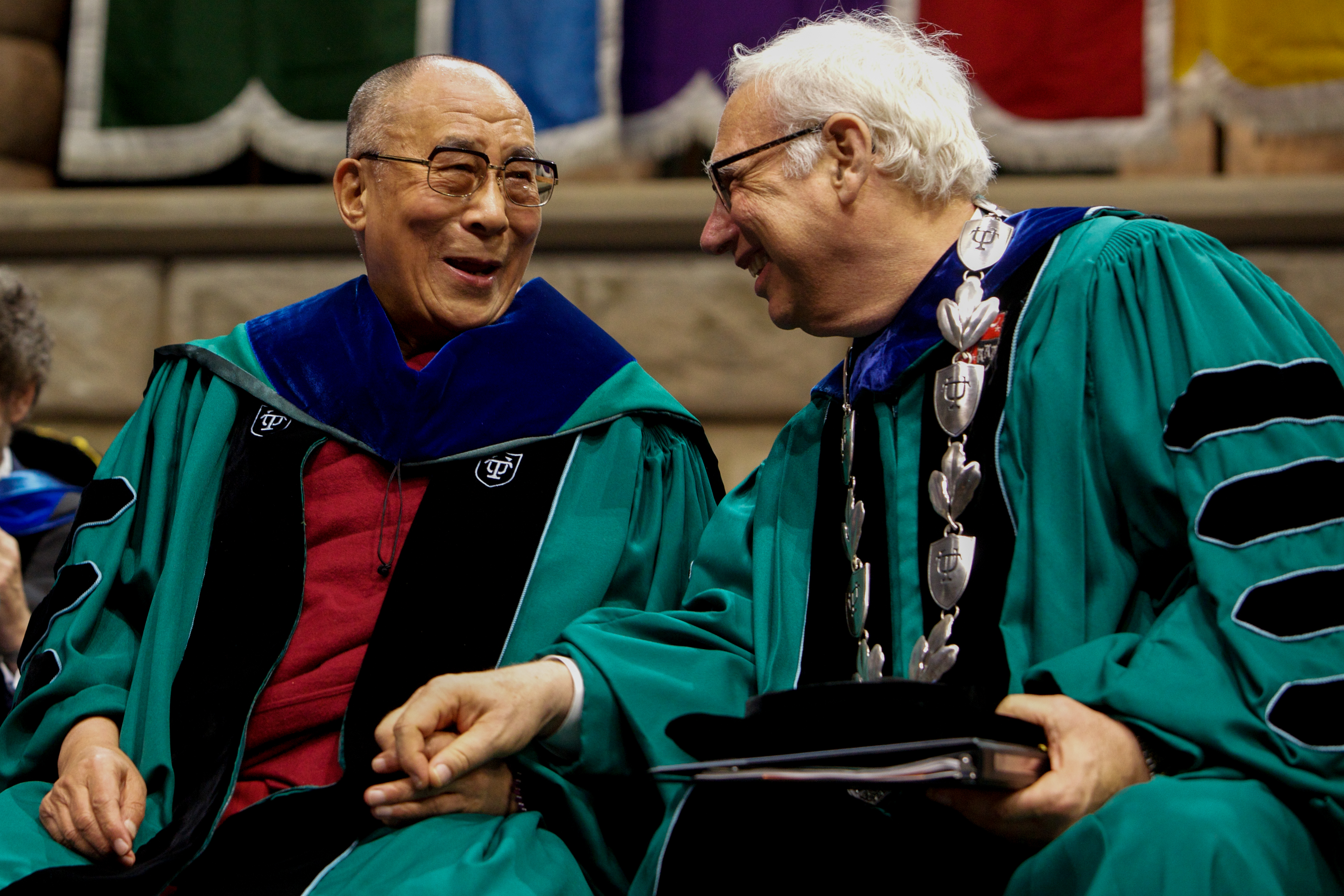
Cowen with the 14th Dalai Lama at Tulane Commencement 2013

Also in 2010 Cowen increased his attention to Tulane's athletics program, including a joint announcement with athletics director Rick Dickson that Tulane would build a new practice facility for basketball and volleyball and recognition that Tulane "must get better" in all its athletics programs and especially men's basketball and football. The message announced that Tulane in academic year 2011-2012 would be back up to the 16 athletics teams fielded prior to Katrina.

== Awards and honors ==
Cowen was one of four US recipients of the Carnegie Corporation Academic Leadership Awards in 2009. Cowen dedicated the $500,000 award to Tulane's community-related activities, including the Cowen Institute for Public Education Initiatives, the Center for Public Service that coordinates the university's service-learning requirements, and social entrepreneurship professorships. The Carnegie Corporation cited Cowen's leadership in New Orleans' recovery from Hurricane Katrina. In 2009, TIME Magazine named Cowen one of the nation's top "10 Best College Presidents". The following year, Cowen was appointed by President Barack Obama to the White House Council for Community Solutions, which advised the President on ways to reconnect young people who are neither working nor in school. Cowen is also a member of the American Academy of Arts and Sciences.

Recipient of the Times-Picayune Loving Cup for 2010, Cowen was also recognized as New Orleanian of the Year in 2011 by Gambit newspaper, Louisianian of the Year in Louisiana Life magazine, and one of the 300 most important people in the 300-year history of New Orleans by the Times-Picayune. Cowen holds honorary doctorates from the University of Notre Dame, Brown, Case Western Reserve, George Mason, and Yeshiva universities as well as several other universities.

== Personal life ==
Cowen's wife of 30 years, Marjorie Feldman Cowen, died on December 16, 2019. They have four grown children and five grandchildren. Cowen remarried in 2022.

Scott and Marjorie Cowen were credited by Mary Matalin for swaying her to relocate to New Orleans. They convinced Matalin that her husband James Carville was right about the merits of moving their family to New Orleans. After having breakfast with the Cowens, Matalin went shopping for a house.

== Notes ==
Academic offices
Preceded by Eamon Kelly	President of Tulane University; 1998 – 2014	Succeeded by Michael Fitts
