= Hridesh Rajan =

American computer scientist

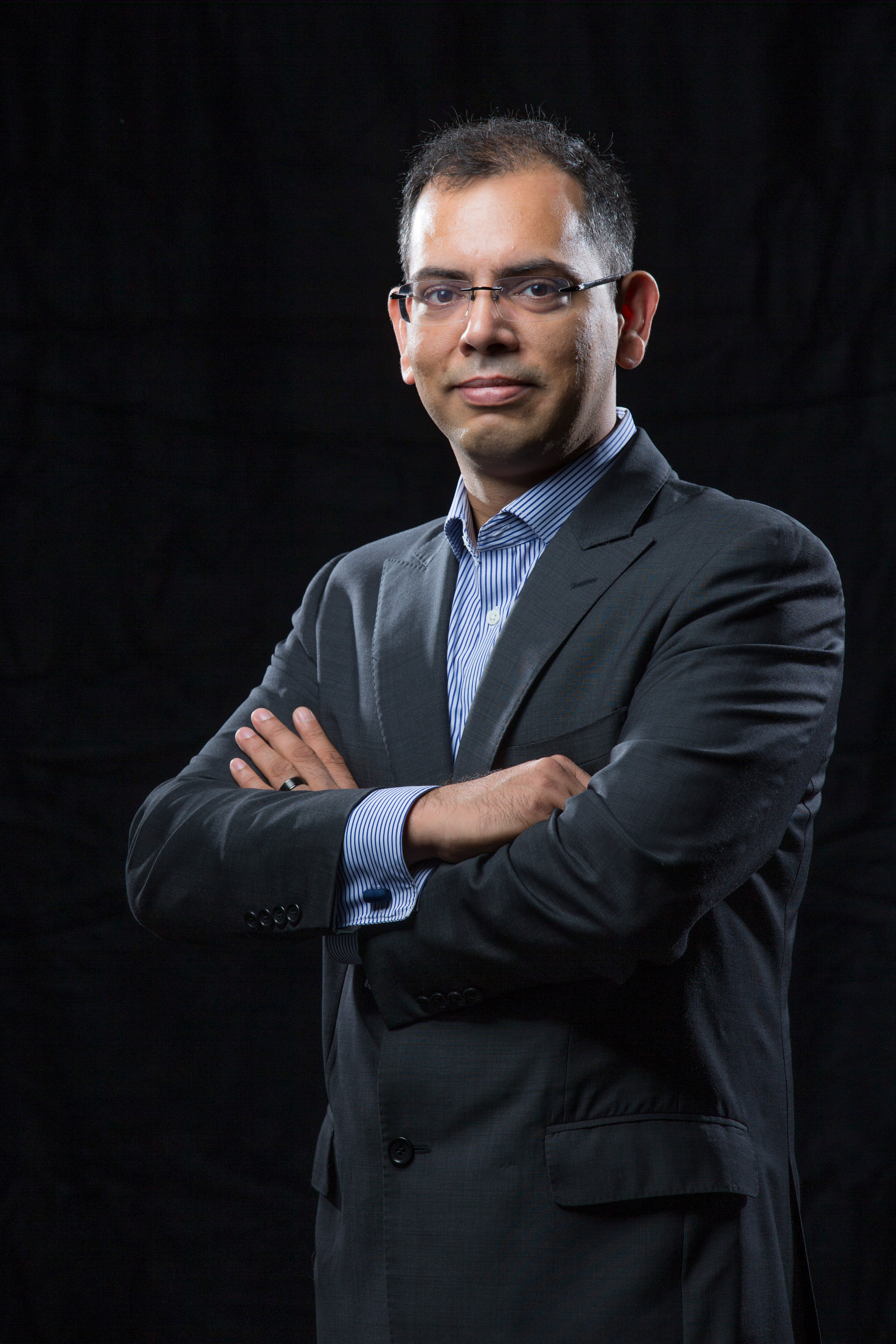
- Rajan in 2017
- Born: Mokama, Bihar, India
- Education: B.Tech, Computer Science and Engineering, 2000, Indian Institute of Technology; MS, computer science, 2004, PhD, computer science, 2005, University of Virginia
- Alma mater: University of Virginia; IIT (BHU) Varanasi
- Scientific career
- Fields: Computer Science, specifically Software engineering and Programming Languages
- Institutions: Iowa State University
- Thesis: Unifying Aspect and Object-Oriented Program Design (2005)
- Doctoral advisor: Kevin J. Sullivan
- Doctoral students: Tyler Sondag, Robert Dyer, Yuheng Long, Mehdi Bagherzadeh, Ganesha Upadhyaya, Md. Johirul Islam, Hamid Bagheri, Samantha Khairunnessa, Rangeet Pan, Sumon Biswas, and Mohammad Wardat
- Website: https://hridesh.github.io/

Hridesh Rajan is an American computer scientist. He serves as the dean of the School of Science and Engineering at Tulane University. Previously, he served as a professor and department chair of computer science at Iowa State University and as the professor-in-charge of the Data Science Program at Iowa State University. He has made significant contributions to the fields of programming languages, software engineering, and data science. He is well known for his work on the Ptolemy and Boa programming languages, which have significantly impacted how crosscutting concerns are modularly reasoned about and how the barriers to data-driven software engineering are reduced.

== Early life and education ==
Rajan was raised in rural India. His educational journey began with a Bachelor of Technology in computer science and engineering from the Indian Institute of Technology, Varanasi, in 2000. He then moved to North America for his graduate studies, earning both his MS in 2004 and his Ph.D. in 2005 in computer science from the University of Virginia. His doctoral research, guided by Kevin J. Sullivan, focused on "Unifying Aspect and Object-Oriented Program Design."

== Work and academic career ==
Following his PhD, Rajan joined the Department of Computer Science faculty at Iowa State University as an assistant professor in 2005. He rose through the academic ranks, becoming associate professor in 2011 and full professor in 2016.

His early work, focused on programming languages and software design, developed language features to enable improved modularity for complex software systems to reduce defects and to improve software quality. He also focused on language features for improving concurrent programming. For this research, he was named an ACM Distinguished Member.

His later works have focused on programming languages and data science infrastructure for analyzing large-scale datasets. During the COVID-19 pandemic, Rajan co-developed a data science infrastructure to improve research efficiencies for scientists who study the novel coronavirus. The tool enables scientists to quickly and efficiently locate, navigate and analyze coronavirus research from all over the world. He helped develop and establish the National Science Foundation Dependable Data-Driven Discovery Institute at Iowa State University. For this work, he was awarded a 2018-19 Fulbright U.S. Scholar Award from the J. William Fulbright Foreign Scholarship Board. He was also appointed the Kingland Professor of Data Analytics. His subsequent works have focused on improving deep learning, for which he has received a Facebook Probability and Programming Award, and an ACM SIGSOFT Distinguished Paper award. He was also elected a fellow of the American Association for the Advancement of Science for "distinguished contributions to data driven science, particularly to modularity and modular reasoning in computer software and the development of the Boa language and infrastructure."

Rajan served as the chair of the Iowa State University Department of Computer Science from 2019 to 2024. In 2024, he was appointed the Dean of the School of Science and Engineering at Tulane University.

== Awards ==
- AAAS Fellow for distinguished contributions to data driven science, particularly to modularity and modular reasoning in computer software and the development of the Boa language and infrastructure
- Fulbright U.S. Scholar for Accelerating International Collaboration on Software Code Analysis for Cybersecurity
- ACM Distinguished Member for outstanding scientific contributions to computing
- National Science Foundation CAREER Award

== Books ==
- An Experiential Introduction to Principles of Programming Languages (2022)
