= Brian T. Edwards =

American scholar

- Education: Yale University
- Occupations: Dean, Professor
- Organization: Tulane University

Brian T. Edwards is dean of the School of Liberal Arts and professor of English at Tulane University in New Orleans, Louisiana. He is the incoming president of Haverford College, to begin July 1, 2027.

Prior to moving to Tulane in 2018, he was on the faculty of Northwestern University, where he was the Crown Professor in Middle East Studies, professor of English and Comparative Literary Studies, and the founding director of the Program in Middle East and North African Studies (MENA).

Edwards's research has two main focuses: the globalization of American studies and his theorization of "cultural circulation", especially vis-à-vis the Middle East and North Africa.

Edwards is also an advocate for language learning at both university and K-12 levels, and has served on the American Academy of Arts and Sciences’ Commission on Language Learning.

== Career ==
=== Education ===
In 1990, Edwards earned his bachelor's degree magna cum laude in English from Yale University. He then received his master's degree, his master of philosophy degree, and his PhD in American studies from Yale.

=== Work ===
Edwards's first book, Morocco Bound: Disorienting America's Maghreb, from Casablanca to the Marrakech Express (2005), examines "the dynamics and select encounters between the Maghreb and the US from the early 1940s to the early 1970s", as Allen Hibbard writes in the journal Comparative Literature Studies.

In the edited collection Globalizing American Studies (2010), Edwards and his co-editor, Dilip P. Gaonkar, argue that the discipline of American studies "needs to allow space for alternative interpretations of the concept of 'America' as it is understood in different contexts outside the United States", as Meghan Warner Mettler says in The Journal of Asian Studies.

Edwards's second book, After the American Century: The Ends of U.S. Culture in the Middle East (2015), considers the reception of US popular culture in Cairo, Casablanca, and Tehran to argue that American cultural influence in the Middle East has waned, according to John Waterbury in Foreign Affairs.

Edwards has appeared in a number of public conversations in the media about US–MENA relations and cultural circulation, including on NPR, PBS's WTTW, NBC Chicago, and Voice of America. Edwards's podcast episode on Paul Bowles, "Baptism of Solitude", which was produced with The Organist (McSweeney's and KCRW), was featured in Hyperallergic's "11 Great Art and Culture Podcast Episodes of 2017".

=== Haverford College ===
In October 2026, Haverford College named Edwards as its 17th president, succeeding Wendy Raymond, who planned to retire at the end of the 2026–27 academic year. Edwards is scheduled to take office on July 1, 2027.

=== Awards and honors ===
Edwards was named a 2005 Carnegie Scholar by the Carnegie Corporation of New York under its Islam Initiative, a 2008 New Directions Fellow by the Andrew W. Mellon Foundation, and a Class of 2015 Emerging Leader by the Chicago Council on Global Affairs. Edwards also received Fulbright Senior Specialists Awards in American studies in 2009 and 2011.

From 2016 to 2017, Edwards served on the American Academy of Arts and Sciences’ Commission on Language Learning. The Commission was charged by Congress to examine language education in the US and make recommendations for ways to meet future education needs, resulting in the report America’s Languages: Investing in Language Education for the 21st Century (2017). The Commission's findings have been featured in the San Francisco Chronicle, The Hill, the Boston Herald, Inside Higher Ed, and the Association for Psychological Science.

=== Controversy ===
In 2024, Edwards was named in a federal Unfair Labor Practice charge against Tulane University for anti-union activities, including direct retaliation against union organizers.

== Personal life ==
Edwards is married to Kate Baldwin, who is Professor of English with joint appointments in the Department of Communication and the Gender and Sexuality Studies Program at Tulane University.

== Publications ==
=== Books ===
- Morocco Bound: Disorienting America's Maghreb, from Casablanca to the Marrakech Express, Duke University Press, 2005.
- After the American Century: The Ends of U.S. Culture in the Middle East, Columbia University Press, 2016.

=== Edited collections ===
- Globalizing American Studies (with Dilip P. Gaonkar), University of Chicago Press, 2010.
- On the Ground: New Directions in Middle East and North African Studies, Northwestern University in Qatar, 2013.

=== Selected journal articles ===
- “Hollywood Orientalism and the Maghreb,” boundary2 (online), The Maghreb after Orientalism (special b2o dossier), December 13, 2018.
- “Islam,” in Keywords for American Cultural Studies, 3rd ed., edited by Bruce Burgett and Glenn Hendler (NY: NYU Press, 2020), 137–141.
- “Tahrir: Ends of Circulation,” Public Culture 23.3 (Fall 2011): 493–504.
- “Logics and Contexts of Circulation,” in A Companion to Comparative Literature, edited by Ali Behdad and Dominic Thomas (Oxford: Blackwell Publishing, 2011), 454–472.
- “American Studies in Tehran,” Public Culture 19.3 (2007): 415–424.
