= Dilip P. Gaonkar =

American academic

Dilip Parameshwar Gaonkar
- Born: 1945 (age 80–81); British India
- Education: University of Mumbai; University of Pittsburgh; Tufts University
- Writing career
- Genres: Rhetoric; Cultural studies Globalization; Ethnic studies Communication studies
- Notable awards: 1991: Golden Anniversary Monographs Award; 1994:Golden Anniversary Monographs Award

Dilip Parameshwar Gaonkar (born 1945) is a Professor in Rhetoric and Public Culture and the Director of Center for Global Culture and Communication at Northwestern University. He is also Executive Director of the Center for Transcultural Studies, an independent scholarly research network concerned with global issues based in Chicago and New York. Gaonkar was closely associated with the influential journal Public Culture from the early 1990s, serving in various editorial capacities: associate editor (1992-2000), executive editor (2000-2009), and editor (2009-2011).

Gaonkar has two main sets of scholarly interests: rhetoric as an intellectual tradition, both its ancient roots and its contemporary mutations; and global modernities and their impact on the political. He has published numerous essays on rhetoric, including "The Idea of Rhetoric in the Rhetoric of Science" that was published along with ten critical responses to the essay in a book, Rhetorical Hermeneutics: Invention and Interpretation in the Age of Science, edited by Alan G. Gross and William Keith (1996). Gaonkar has edited a series of books on global cultural politics: Globaizing American Studies (with Brian T. Edwards, 2010), Alternative Modernities (2001), and Disciplinarity and Dissent in Cultural Studies (1995). He has also edited several special issues of journals: “Laclau's On Populist Reason” (with Robert Hariman, for Cultural Studies, 2012), “Cultures of Democracy” (for Public Culture, 2007), “Commitments in a Post-Foundational World” (with Keith Topper, 2005), “Technologies of Public Persuasion” (with Elizabeth Povinelli, 2003), and “New Imaginaries” (with Benjamin Lee, 2002). He is currently working on two edited volumes: Oxford Handbook on Rhetoric and Political Theory (with Keith Topper) and Distribution of the Sensible: Ranciere on Politics and Aesthetics (with Scott Durham). Gaonkar is also co-writing a book on populism with Charles Taylor and Craig Calhoun.

Dilip Gaonkar hails from the Ankola region in Karwar district (south of Goa). He is a grandson of SAPA. Gaonkar and Venkanna H. Naik. Gaonkar is married to Sally Ewing, a writer and former Associate Dean of Advising and Student Affairs at Northwestern University's School of Communication.

== Academic life ==
Goankar's doctoral thesis at the University of Pittsburgh was titled Aspects of sophistic pedagogy (1984). His prior degrees include M.A. in Theatre (Tufts University), M.A. in Political Science (University of Bombay) and B.A. in Politics and Philosophy (Elphinstone College). Before joining Northwestern, Gaonkar was in the Department of Speech Communication at the University of Illinois in 1989 and then at the University of Wisconsin–Madison.

=== Awards ===
Gaonkar has been awarded the National Communication Association's (NCA) Golden Anniversary Monographs Award in 1991 and 1994.

== Selected works ==
- Gaonkar, Dilip Parameshwar (1984). Aspects of sophistic pedagogy. University of Pittsburgh.
- Nelson, Cary; Dilip Parameshwar Gaonkar (1996). Disciplinarity and dissent in cultural studies. Routledge. ISBN 0-415-91372-1.
- Gaonkar, Dilip Parameshwar (2001). Alternative modernities. Duke University Press. ISBN 0-8223-2714-7.
- Gaonkar, Dilip Parameshwar; Benjamin Lee (2002). New imaginaries. Duke University Press. ISBN 0-8223-6472-7.
- Povinelli, Elizabeth A.; Dilip Parameshwar Gaonkar (2003). Technologies of public persuasion: an accidental issue. Duke University Press. ISBN 0-8223-6585-5.
- Gaonkar, Dilip Parameshwar (2007). Cultures of Democracy. Duke University Press. ISBN 978-0-8223-6672-0.

== Work anthologized ==
- Simons, Herbert W. (1990). "14. Rhetoric and Its Double: Dilip Parameshwar Gaonkar". The Rhetorical turn: invention and persuasion in the conduct of inquiry. University of Chicago Press. pp. 341–360. ISBN 0-226-75902-4.
- Leff, Michael C.; Fred J. Kauffeld (1995). "Epilogue: THE ENIGMA OF ARRIVAL: DILIP PARAMESHWAR GAONKAR". Texts in Context: Critical Dialogues on Significant Episodes in American Political Rhetoric. Routledge. pp. 255–257. ISBN 0-9611800-4-8.
- Musick, David (1995). "CLOSE READINGS OF THE THIRD KIND: Dilip Parameshwar Gaonkar". An introduction to the sociology of juvenile delinquency. SUNY Press. pp. 330–333. ISBN 0-7914-2352-2.
- Gross, Alan G.; William M. Keith (1997). "1. Idea of Rhetoric: Dilip P. Gaonkar". Rhetorical hermeneutics: invention and interpretation in the age of science. SUNY Press. pp. 25–28. ISBN 0-7914-3109-6.
- Jost, Walter; Wendy Olmsted (2004). "Introduction: Contingency and Probability: Dilip Parmeshwar Gaonkar". A companion to rhetoric and rhetorical criticism. Wiley-Blackwell. pp. 5–20. ISBN 1-4051-0112-1.
