= Sannappa Parameshwar Gaonkar =

Sannappa P. Gaonkar
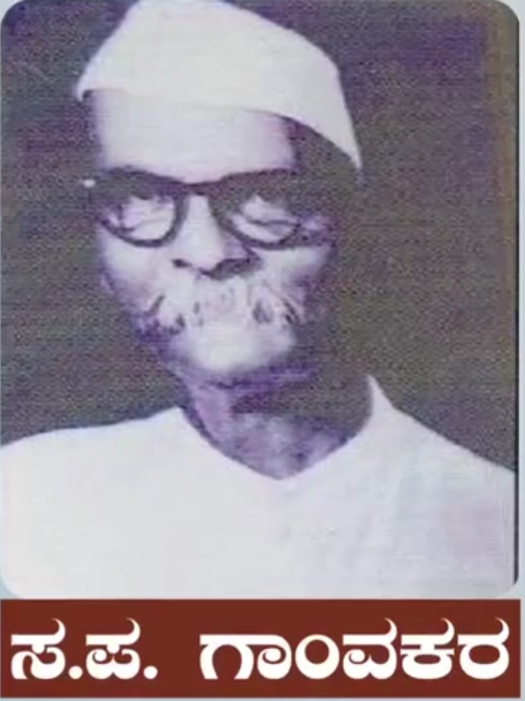
- Born: 11 January 1885 present-day Uttar Kannada, Karnataka
- Died: 1972 (aged 86–87); Ankola
- Spouse: Venkamma U. Keremane from Hiregutti
- Writing career
- Pen name: SAPA

Sannappa Parameshwar Gaonkar (11 January 1885 – 1972), also called Sa.Pa. Gaonkar, was an Indian Politician, and an author. Sapa. Gaonkar was often described as "Sajjan", or "good and gentle". Gaonkar was imprisoned during the British Raj for having participated in the Quit India Movement, and later served as a Deputy Chief Minister in B. G. Kher’s Cabinet of the Composite State of Bombay, India.

== Early life ==
Sannappa Parameshwara Gaonkar (Grandson of Ram Gaonkar) was born on 11 January 1885 in Torke into a Nadavaru family. Sa. Pa. was a head master of the Kannada Primary School, at Tadadi. At the age of 40 (1925), Gaonkar graduated from the Willingdon College, Sangli. He was an officer at Hubli municipality.

== As Politician ==
After his retirement in the year 1942, S. P. Gaonkar participated in Quit India Movement and joined the Swaraj Party. In the year 1946–47, B. G. Kher nominated Gaonkar as a Deputy Chief Minister in his Cabinet of the Composite State of Bombay, India.

SAPA was the paternal grandfather of Dilip Gaonkar a professor at Northwestern University.

== Founded Organisation ==
Dr.Sannappa Parameshwar Gaonkar,

Founder and First President Of Nadavara Sangha, Ankola (Nadavara Community Organisation) This organization has completed a century.

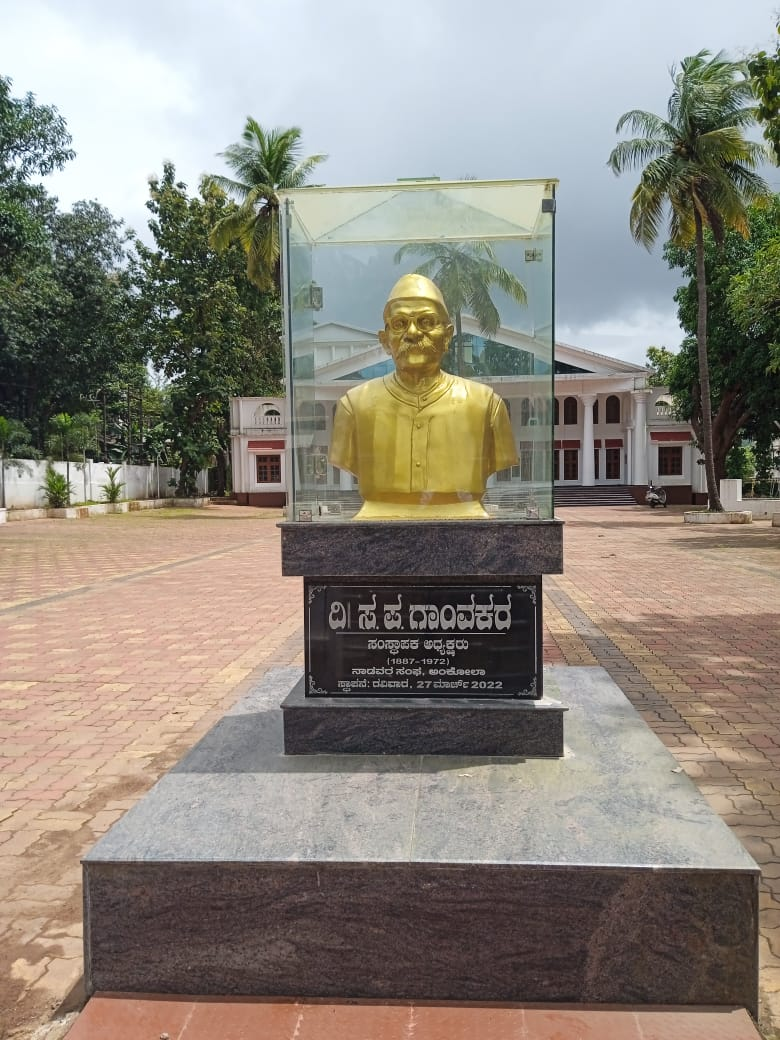
Dr.Sannappa Parameshwar Gaonkar, Bronze Statue

== Poetry and Writings ==
SAPA is the paternal grandfather of Dilip Gaonkar a professor at Northwestern University.

- Mugilu Kavan (1932)
- Raitar Golu
- Nadakale
- Ankoleyavanu
- Gitanjali ( A translation of Rabindranath Tagore’s Gitanjali into Kannada language) (1962).
