= Downtown New Orleans =

Geographic designation

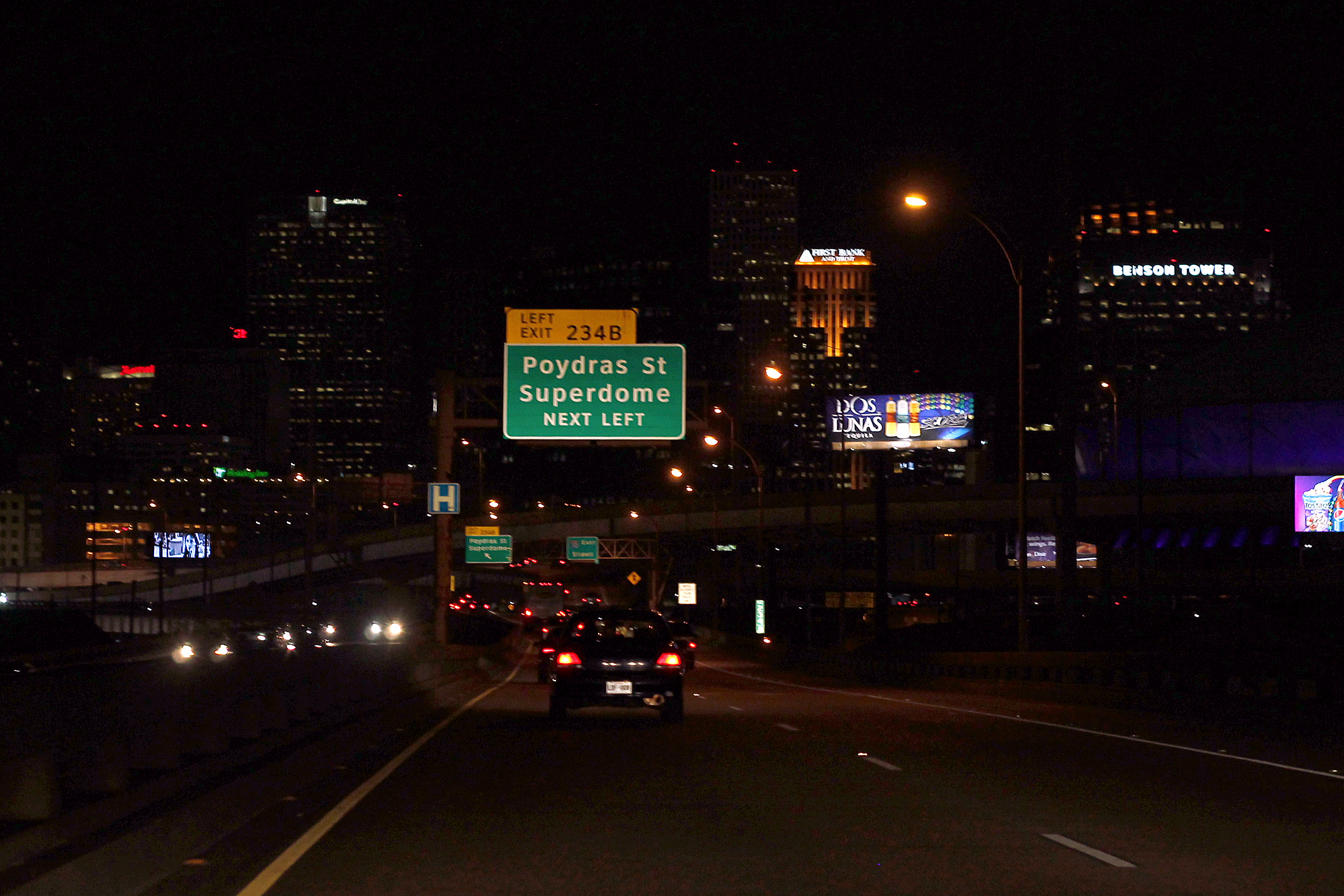
The interstate 10 exit that leads directly into the "Downtown" New Orleans area at night.

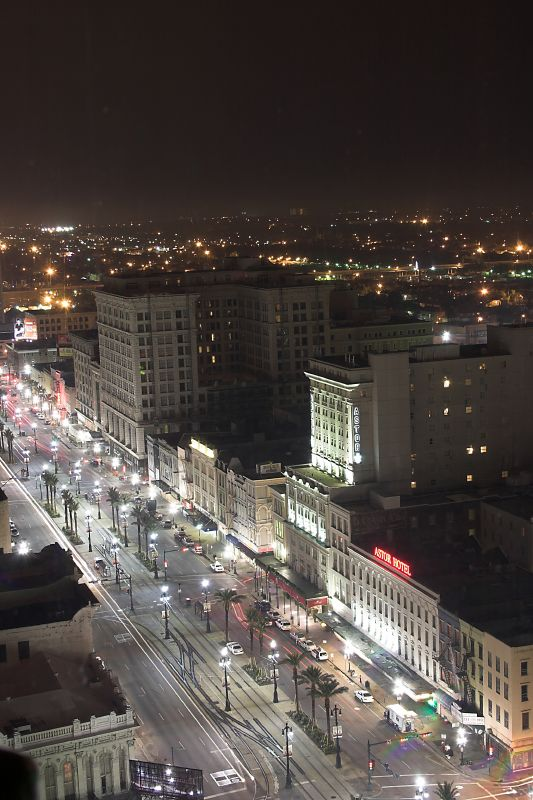
Canal Street at night, looking away from the river towards Mid-City; the traditional dividing line.

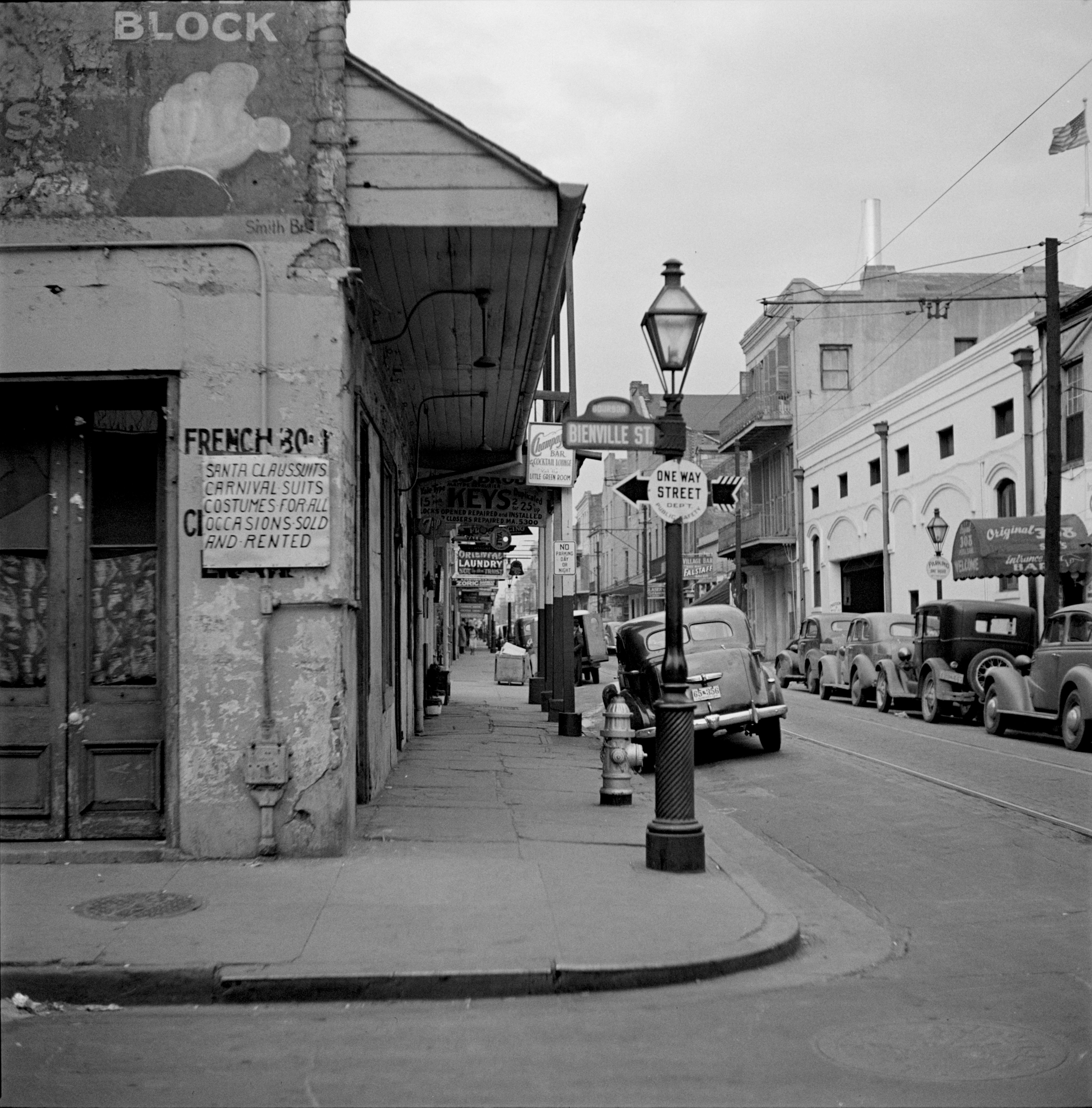
A picture of the well known Bourbon Street in Downtown New Orleans in 1941.

In New Orleans, Louisiana, United States, downtown has historically referred to neighborhoods along the Mississippi River, downriver (roughly northeast) from Canal Street – including the French Quarter, Tremé, Faubourg Marigny, Bywater, the 9th Ward, and other neighborhoods. Contrary to the common usage of the term downtown in other cities, this historic application of the term excluded the New Orleans Central Business District. The term continues to be employed as it has been historically, although many younger people and migrants from other parts of the country will use "downtown" as it is used elsewhere; that is, to mean the Central Business District/Warehouse District area.

== History ==
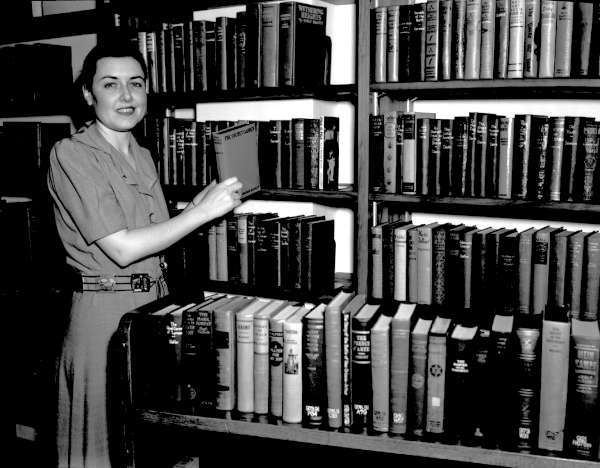
Alvar Street branch New Orleans Public Library, 1940. The WPA-built branch library is on Alvar Street near Burgundy in the Bywater neighborhood

In the 19th century, much of New Orleans' downtown (downriver from Canal Street) was still predominantly Francophone. Downtown hosted the city's French-speaking Creole communities. There was a traditional rivalry with the predominantly Anglophone uptown New Orleans on the other side of Canal Street. The broad median of Canal Street became known as the neutral ground, where partisans of the two sections of the city could meet for discussions and business without going into each other's territory. The term "neutral ground" underwent broadening in the local lexicon, and now refers to medians in general. The city was for years divided into Downtown and Uptown.

Development of the low-lying Back of Town (the swamp and marsh extending northwards from the edge of development to the shores of Lake Pontchartrain) only began after 1900, as longstanding drainage issues were solved. While the downtown/uptown division of the city has sometimes been overstated (by the late 19th century there were already substantial numbers of people of francophone orientation living uptown, and of anglophone orientation living downtown), it continues to be a factor in New Orleans culture into the 21st century, marking, for example, the division of the Mardi Gras Indians into Downtown and Uptown tribes. With the increasing development of the Back of Town in the years after World War II resulting in the mature districts of Lakeview and Gentilly, it became increasingly difficult to categorize neighborhoods as "Uptown" or "Downtown". The growth of New Orleans East, as well as suburban Jefferson Parish, further complicated the picture. By the 1990s, the terms had largely fallen out of use, with only the merest fraction of the population of Greater New Orleans inhabiting the region once divided into Uptown and Downtown zones. Today, use of the word "downtown" will most likely be taken to mean the CBD/Warehouse District neighborhood (i.e., the area within the Downtown Development District's ambit), and the use of individual neighborhood names or wards has replaced the historic use of the term "downtown", although "uptown" has remained in use – albeit with a lower boundary, now stretching along the Pontchartrain Expressway rather than Canal Street.

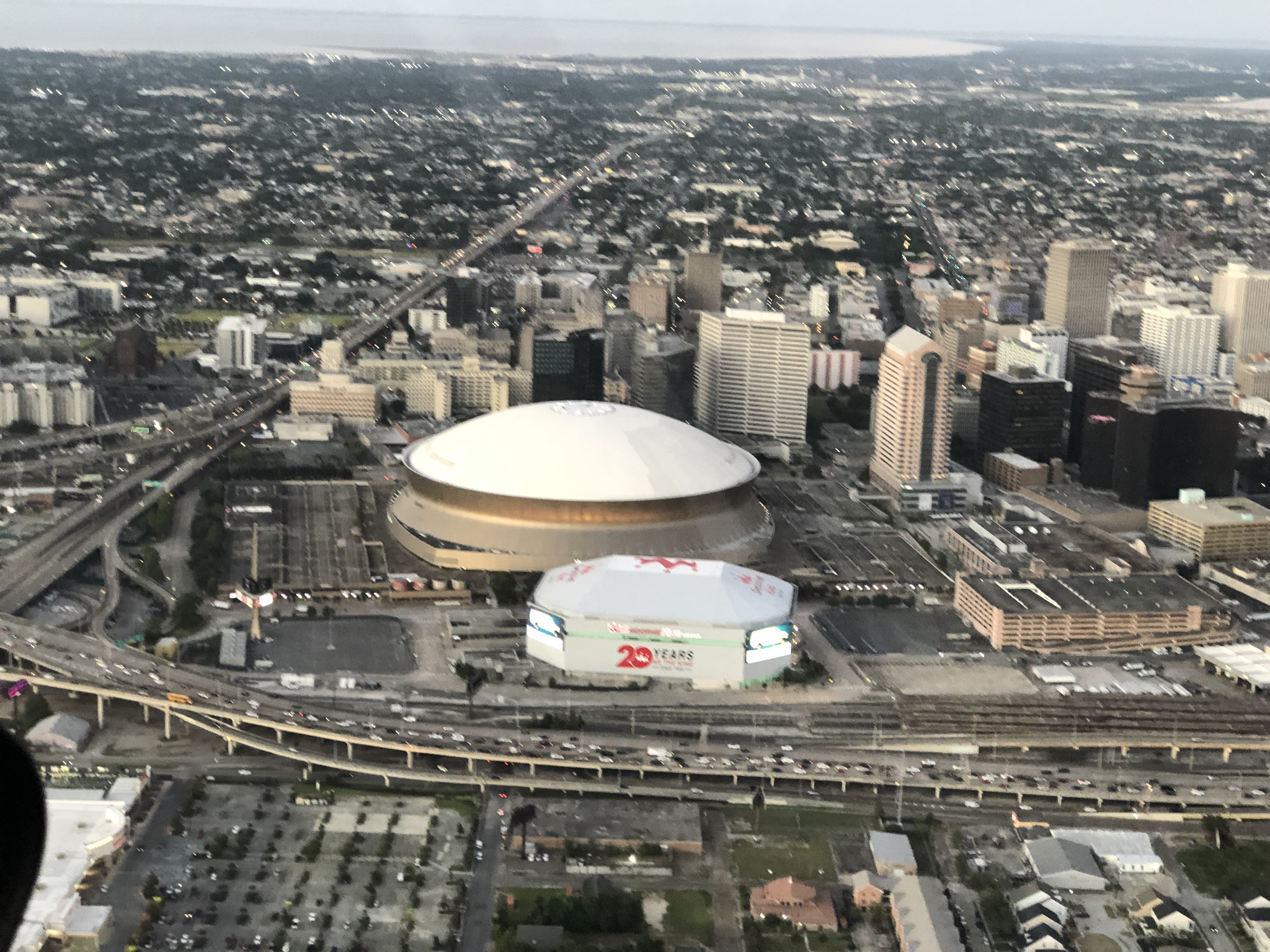
You see the Superdome and Smoothie King Center along with the surrounding area of Downtown New Orleans.

== See also ==
- New Orleans Downtown Development District
- New Orleans Central Business District
- Canal Street, New Orleans
- Uptown New Orleans
