= Newcomb Art Museum =

Newcomb Art Museum of Tulane University

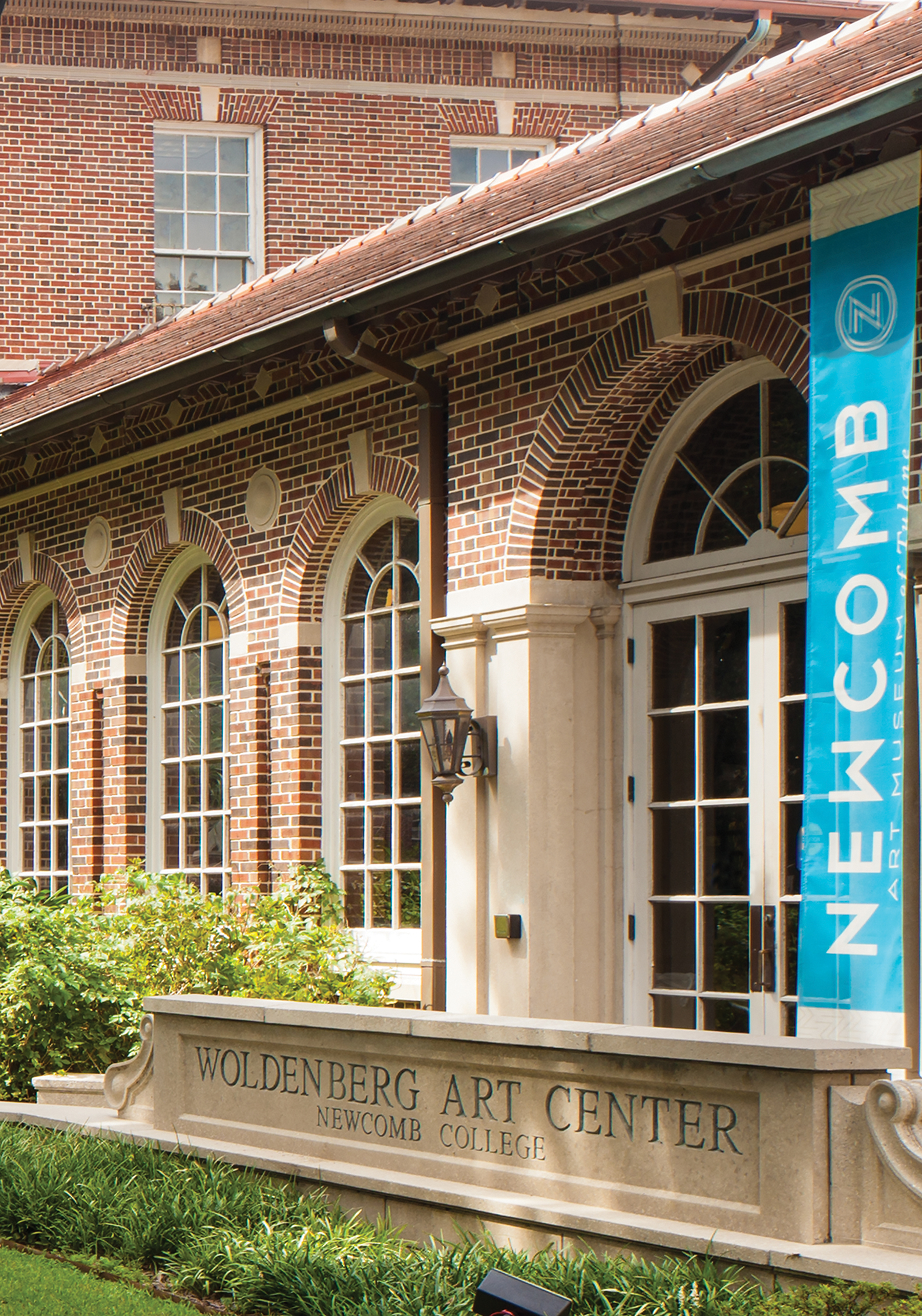
- Established: 1996
- Location: Tulane University, New Orleans
- Coordinates: 29.9418°N 90.1211°W
- Type: Art Museum
- Directors: Maurita N. Poole, Ph.D.
- Public transit access: 12 Tulane University/Audubon Park and Zoo stop
- Website: newcombartmuseum.tulane.edu

Newcomb Art Museum of Tulane University is an art museum located in the Woldenberg Art Center on the campus of Tulane University in New Orleans, Louisiana, United States. It has been historically known for its significant collection of Newcomb Pottery and other crafts produced at Newcomb College, as well as administering the art collections of the university. Since 2014, the institution has increasingly focused on exhibitions and programs that explore socially engaged art, civic dialogue, and community transformation.

== History ==
In 1886, H. Sophie Newcomb Memorial College was founded by Josephine Louise Newcomb in memory of her daughter Sophie. The first national coordinate college for women, Newcomb followed industrial trends offering intensive design training for decorative arts production.

The endowment was established by Mrs. Newcomb to provide, perpetuate, and protect the women’s college indefinitely. In the 1970s, Tulane sought to use this endowment for the purpose of the entire university during a time of economic hardship. Later, in the 1980s an effort was initiated to close the college and incorporate it into Tulane University. At the time of the Newcomb Centennial Celebration in 1986, concerned graduates of Newcomb College met as an ad hoc committee to re-establish the intended purpose of the original endowment and to reaffirm the integrity of Newcomb College. The Tulane board of trustees ultimately affirmed the status of H. Sophie Newcomb Memorial College and established a Board to administer the Newcomb Endowment.

During this period, Mignon Faget, a New Orleans jewelry artist and a member of the committee, suggested establishing an art museum to maintain the legacy of Newcomb's art program and to ensure the permanence of Newcomb College. In the early 1990s, a grant funded by Joyce Frank Menschel, another Newcomb alumna, ultimately led to the establishment of such an institution.

In 1996, the Newcomb Art Gallery became a reality when the Newcomb Art Department completed an expansion and renovation that included the addition of a 3,600-square-foot (330 m^{2}) exhibition space dedicated to presenting contemporary and historic exhibits to the Tulane and New Orleans communities. The gallery became its own department within the School of Liberal Arts.

Although the gallery's administrative offices were flooded with four feet of water by Hurricane Katrina in 2005, the art holdings were relatively undamaged. After Katrina, Tulane closed Newcomb College and diverted the school's endowment to other uses. In 2010, the gallery received a Community Arts Award from the Arts Council of New Orleans.

In 2012, Tulane University implemented a new reporting structure for the gallery, moving it out of the School of Liberal Arts and putting it under the Office of the Provost. With the hiring of director Mónica Ramírez-Montagut, who began her tenure in July 2014 and left July 2020, the institution began an intensive year-long transformation.

In July 2015, the Newcomb Art Gallery officially became the Newcomb Art Museum of Tulane University. The change was made to distinguish the art space from a commercial gallery and to indicate its status as a collections-holding institution.

Miriam Taylor Fair served as the museum's interim director from July 2020 to August 2021 and oversaw the institution's closure and reopening during the COVID-19 pandemic.

Maurita N. Poole was hired as director August 2021.

== Exhibitions ==
The museum holds on average four exhibitions annually. Shows encourage the creative exchange of ideas and cross-disciplinary collaborations around innovative art and design. The Museum has presented exhibitions featuring the work of such recognized artists as Mickalene Thomas, Pat Steir, KAWS, Joan Mitchell, Marsden Hartley, Chakaia Booker, Monir Shahroudy Farmanfarmaian, Diane Arbus, Nick Cave, David Smith, and Ellsworth Kelly, as well as artists with a Newcomb connection like Mark Rothko, Ida Kohlmeyer, and current faculty member Gene Koss. Honoring the legacy of the artistic traditions of Newcomb College, the Museum regularly presents work by women artists. In 2003 the Newcomb Art Museum (then Gallery) commissioned a new work by artist Carrie Mae Weems that became known as her "Louisiana Project".

The exhibitions include educational programs such as lectures, symposia, film series, artist-led family programs, public tours, performances, studio demonstrations, and partnerships with other organizations.

== Collections ==
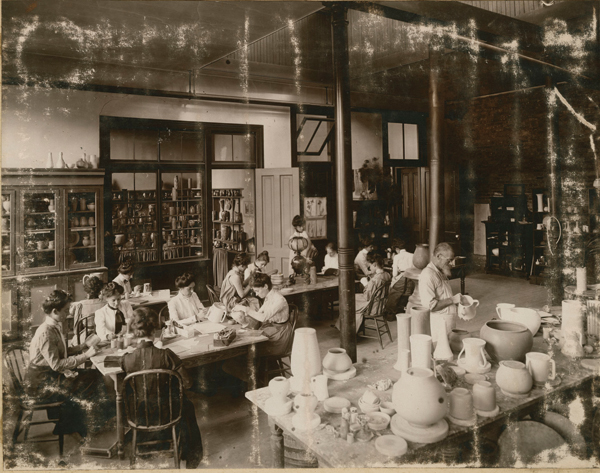
Newcomb Pottery Building. Washington Avenue Campus, ca. 1905. Newcomb Art School Scrapbook, University Archives, Tulane University.

=== Newcomb Arts and Crafts ===
The museum holds the world's largest collection of Newcomb arts and crafts produced at Newcomb College from 1895 until 1940. The collection includes outstanding groups of Newcomb pottery as well as other objects associated with the Arts & Crafts Movement including embroidery, bound books, and metalwork. The museum's collection includes important pieces made by Sadie Irvine, Harriet Coulter Joor, and Marie de Hoa LeBlanc.

=== Tiffany Glass ===
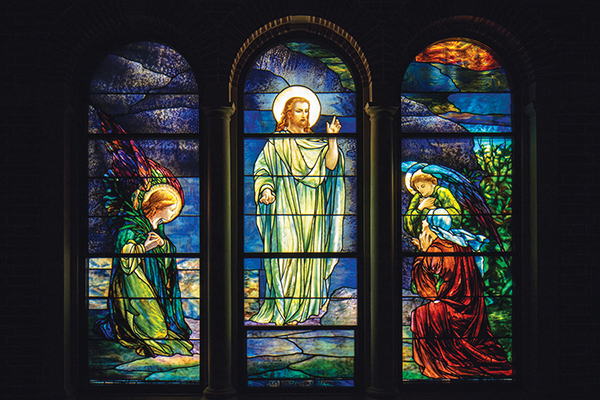
Tiffany and Company, Resurrection, c.1895

The uptown campus of Tulane University is home to several one-of-a-kind stained-glass windows designed by Louis Comfort Tiffany. Newcomb College founder Josephine Louise Newcomb and her confidant Frank Walter Callender commissioned the majority of these works between 1894 and 1896 for a chapel at Newcomb's Washington Avenue campus in New Orleans' Garden District. In the decades following Newcomb's 1918 relocation to the Tulane Broadway campus, the two stained-glass triptychs were installed in the Woodward Way breezeway fronting the museum’s interior façade. The school's other Tiffany windows are located in the Myra Clare Rogers Memorial Chapel and in Tilton Memorial Hall.

=== Other Holdings ===
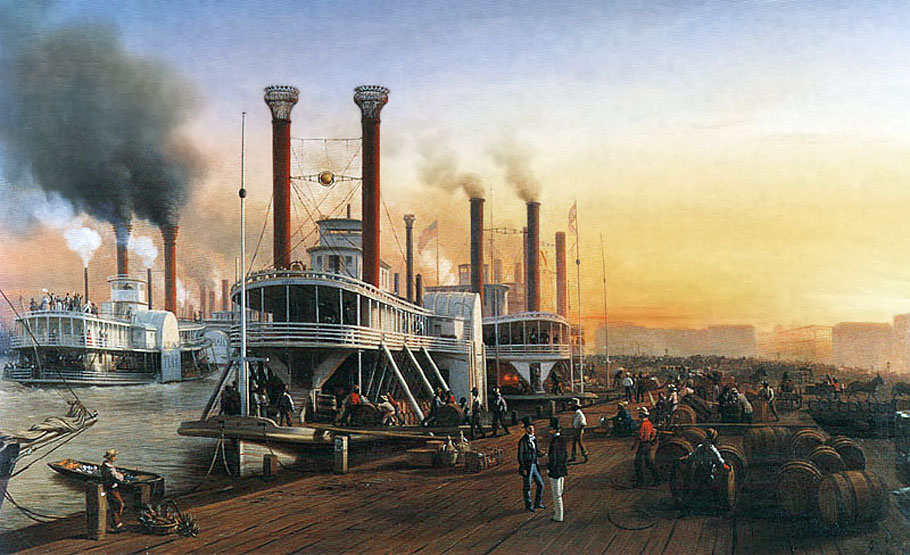
Hippolyte Sebron, Steamboats in New Orleans, 1853, Collection of Tulane University

The museum administers a collection of drawings, watercolors, paintings, sculpture, and prints by Newcomb College-affiliated artists such as Angela Gregory, Ida Kohlmeyer, Lynda Benglis, and Caroline Durieux. In addition, the university's teaching collection includes examples of Louisiana portraiture, neo-classical sculpture, as well as modern and contemporary prints and photography. Notable holdings are works by Hippolyte Sebron, John James Audubon, Randolph Rogers, Carrie Mae Weems, Andy Warhol, and Garry Winogrand.

== See also ==
- Newcomb Pottery
- H. Sophie Newcomb Memorial College
- Tiffany glass
- List of museums in New Orleans
