= Jim Steg =

American artist (1922–2001)

- Born: 1922; Alexandria, Virginia
- Died: 2001 (aged 78–79)
- Occupations: Artist, printmaker

Jim Steg (1922–2001) was an artist, printmaker, and professor based in New Orleans, Louisiana. Considered the most influential printmaker to be based in New Orleans in the twentieth century, Steg made a substantial impact on printmaking in New Orleans through his own work and over his 43-year tenure as a professor of printmaking at Newcomb College. Over the course of a long artistic career that saw him engage with several 20th century art movements, Steg used nearly every known printmaking technique and invented some of his own.

== Early life ==
Born in Alexandria, Virginia but raised on a farm in Upstate New York, James Louis Steg lived a quiet childhood between the two World Wars. He showed both a keen interest and a natural talent in drawing from an early age, and dreamed of becoming a cartoonist. While still in high school, he traveled to Chicago to attend a workshop at the Art Institute, where he would receive his first formal artistic training and sketch his first live figure at age 16.

== WWII Ghost Army ==
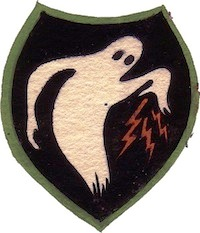
A patch with Ghost Army insignia

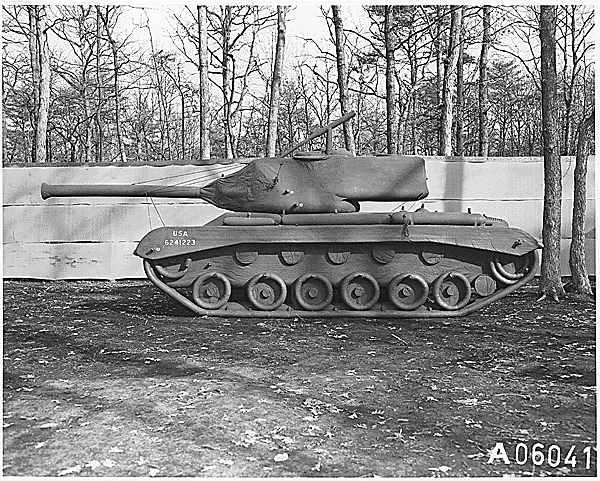
An inflatable tank used by the Ghost Army, WWII

When WWII broke out, Steg enlisted in the United States Army, where his artistic training was put to use in a tactical unit known as the Ghost Army. The Ghost Army was made up of 1000 soldiers with artistic backgrounds, including such future titans as Abstract Expressionist Ellsworth Kelly and fashion designer Bill Blass, who were tasked with using their skills to deceive the enemy. Steg and the other members of the 23rd Headquarters Special Troops created and deployed fake inflatable tanks to fool the Germans into thinking Allied troops were nearby, impersonated radio operators to send false intel over the airwaves, and committed several other forms of creative espionage. Steg and a number of other artists in the unit showed their work at an attic gallery in their barracks in Briey, France, in the last months of the war (in between trips to the front). Jim appears to have been responsible for designing the notices for the exhibitions. Jim Steg's experience as a member of the Ghost Army would make an enormous impact on both his life and his art.

The Ghost Army unit proved to be a fruitful creative environment. Steg, along with his comrades Bill Blass and Jack Masey, organized temporary exhibitions of their wartime art; one was staged in the attic of a deserted church. During this time, Steg created his first mature body of work, a series of graphite and watercolor portraits of civilians, soldiers, and refugees that he called "spontaneous impressions." These works are given a haunting quality with context, as many of the Russian refugee subjects portrayed (who often signed their own names next to Steg's) would not survive their return to Russia.

== Early work and career: 1945–1960 ==
After the war, Steg arrived in New York City, where he was given his first solo show at the Weyhe Gallery exhibiting the portraits he had made in combat. In a contemporary interview about the exhibition, Steg described his subjects as "the people of Europe ... The little men of the streets ... The people who suffered the most during the war." At Weyhe Gallery, which was and still is focused on American fine art prints, Steg's interest in printmaking was piqued. Soon after his exhibition, he enrolled in the University of Iowa's newly established MFA program in printmaking. There, under the tutelage of noted Argentine-American printmaker Mauricio Lasansky, Steg began to incorporate more abstract and cubist influences into his work, which had previously been exclusively figurative.

Steg's early prints of the late 1940s were mainly engravings, and etchings. He then began to experiment with woodblock printing and etching in the early 1950s. In 1951, Steg accepted a position as professor of printmaking at Newcomb College at Tulane University, a position he would hold until his retirement in 1992. He continued to push the boundaries of his art during his tenure at Newcomb College, experimenting with the serigraph process, collagraphy, lithography, and toner drawings, among others.

== Innovations and accolades: 1960–1975 ==
Beginning in the early 1960s, Steg was represented by the famed New York City gallery Associated American Artists, resulting in Steg's first New York Times feature in 1963. Steg's printmaking reached its apex in the mid-1960s, "when he introduced photographic images into his intaglio plates." This innovation to combine photoresist etchings with the intaglio process put Steg on the forefront of American printmaking, alongside contemporaries like Robert Rauschenberg and Andy Warhol. Steg was "one of the first artists to begin using photoresist etching in a collage-like fashion and to combine it with other printmaking processes." Steg's work in this new process was shown alongside the work of 18 other artists in the 1968 exhibition "Photography in Printmaking" at Associated American Artists, and was compared favorably to Warhol's silkscreen paintings of Jacqueline Kennedy in a contemporary New York Times review.

In the early 1970s, Steg began to explore the human figure in a new way by "[using] his own body as an implement, often rolling his face across a prepared plate to create a flattened, stretched representation whose ultimate appearance was dictated somewhat by chance." This new technique blended the abstract with the figurative, producing striking prints such as those from his Seven Attributes series of 1972. These prints succeeded in developing "his own visual language" and "establishing [Steg] as a unique voice in the field."

== Late-career successes: 1975–1995 ==
While Steg's work received favorable coverage in New York City and abroad, he was primarily recognized as a teacher, rather than as a fine artist, in his adopted home of New Orleans. Residing in New Orleans rather than New York City, the center of the contemporary art world, prevented Steg from doing the necessary self-promotion required to reach a large audience; Steg remarked cynically on this fact in a 1967 interview with the Tulane newspaper: "an artist can become rich through high pressure promotion. This doesn't make for good art, but for successful artists." In a 1974 interview, Steg decried both the conservative New Orleans art market and Newcomb College's long history of decorative art, rather than fine art, as reasons his national and international reputation flourished while his local renown lagged behind. The author, longtime New Orleans art critic Joslyn Fosberg, conferred: "Jim Steg makes prints. They are known the world over ... But he is hardly known here." This trend was corrected in 1978 with Thirty Years of J.L. Steg: 1948–1978, Steg's first solo retrospective at the New Orleans Museum of Art, which secured Steg's place in the pantheon of twentieth century New Orleans artists, alongside painters George Dunbar and Ida Kohlmeyer and photographer Clarence John Laughlin.

== Death and posthumous exhibitions ==
Jim Steg died in 2001 at the age of 79. His obituary was written by Daniel Piersol, then Curator of Prints and Drawings at the New Orleans Museum of Art, who remembered him as "one of America's most distinguished printmakers." In the years since his death, Steg's archive has been meticulously maintained by his widow, Frances Swigart Steg. The Jim Steg Collection, managed by Swigart Steg, numbers over 1,000 works and includes "collagraphs, charcoal drawings, serigraphs, woodcut prints, sculptures, ink toner drawings, photoresist etchings, aquatints, color etchings, and paintings"

In 2017, the New Orleans Museum of Art debuted Jim Steg: New Work, the first solo museum retrospective of Steg's work since his previous NOMA show in 1978. Staged in the museum's Templeman Galleries and numbering over 40 works spanning the length of the artist's career, Jim Steg: New Work highlighted Steg's contribution to twentieth century printmaking both in New Orleans and beyond.
