= Byron McKeeby =

American artist

Byron G. McKeeby
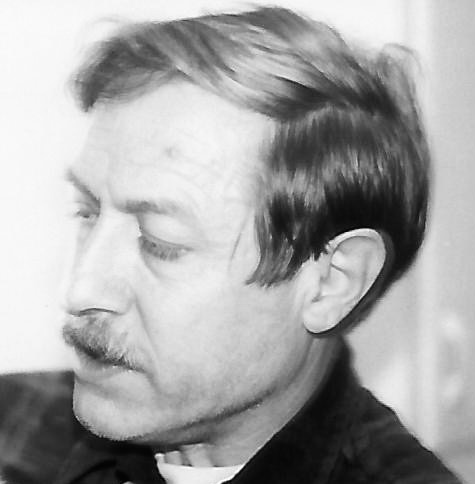
- McKeeby in 1983
- Born: Byron Gordon McKeeby; February 27, 1936; Humboldt, Iowa, US
- Died: November 3, 1984 (aged 48); Knoxville, Tennessee, US
- Resting place: Berry Highland Memorial Cemetery, Knoxville
- Education: Coe College, Art Institute of Chicago, Tulane University
- Known for: Lithography
- Awards: Tamarind Institute Artist-Teacher Fellow

Byron Gordon McKeeby (1936-1984) was an American artist, educator and master printmaker known primarily for lithography. McKeeby's interest dovetailed with a burgeoning contemporary community in advancing lithography as an art form. He was active in all form of print exhibition. He built a full scope printmaking department of rank at the University of Tennessee that exists today.

== Biography ==
=== Early years ===
McKeeby, son of Byron J. and Miriam McKeeby, was born on February 27, 1936, in Humboldt, Iowa, later growing up in Cedar Rapids, IA. Growing up after the Great Depression and during the World War II 1940s, McKeeby knew the hardships of the day, particularly after his father died while he was still a teenager. McKeeby's youth, however, was enriched by his mother's interest in art, particularly Rosa Bonheur.

McKeeby was the grandson of Byron H. McKeeby, a Cedar Rapids dentist, who posed as the farmer in Grant Wood's American Gothic. Ultimately he referenced this relationship in an untitled, uneditioned lithograph (embedded with the wording 'The American Farmer Can Grow Just About Anything') known to be from 1984, which features his grandfather, Byron H. McKeeby's image.

=== Education ===
Like his parents, McKeeby was a Coe College graduate and while at Coe he became interested in art through Professor Marvin Cone, who was a lifelong friend of painter Grant Wood. Years later in a Coe College interview McKeeby acknowledged that Cone was "an extraordinary human, and a lasting influence on his life".

Upon graduating Coe College in 1959 he proceeded to the Art Institute of Chicago where he studied painting, graduating with a Bachelor of Fine Arts in 1963. Several of his class contemporaries, one of which was Jim Nutt, ultimately formed The Hairy Who, a group reflective of the 1960s independence of American art.

Subsequently, McKeeby earned a Master of Fine Arts at Tulane University studying with innovative printmaker Jim Steg, it was there his interest and rising success as a lithographer was realized. His Master's thesis paper focused on the macabre in art, entitled, "The Grotesque as a Positive Element in Art". A representative image from that time is "Okina".

Post M.F.A. McKeeby was awarded a Tamarind Institute Artist-Teacher Fellow in 1965 where he was mentored by Garo Antreasian deepening his interest and expertise in Lithography. During this time two lithographic prints, Monogatari and Okina, were produced. McKeeby detailed his work as found in the Tamarind Print Record Archives. The record includes the specifics of the lithographic limestone grain, transfer and drawing materials, notes on etching and printing as well as notes of any surface treatment. McKeeby credits Antreasian (co-author of The Tamarind Book of Lithography; Art & Technique) with an 'acid tint' method. The record of edition printing reveals specific color runs, paper types such as Arches paper, and the print edition including proofs such as bon à tirer, printer's, Artist's proof, trial, Tamarind, cancellation, or presentation proofs as well as the final edition size. The records also reveal the artist's creative hand side-by-side with the rigor of producing professional prints. Particular to McKeeby, the Tamarind record shows his interest in experimentation as part of the creative process. This approach became visible in the span of his life's art work and his approach in teaching.

McKeeby’s Tamarind edition lithographs also fell under the Tamarind Collector’s Agreement (1961-1965), where the first seven sets were sold to collectors with six month subscriptions.

The guiding principles of the Tamarind Institute of creating master artist-printers, embracing diversity of style and fostering collaboration were employed in Fall of 1965 when McKeeby joined the University of Tennessee, Knoxville, Art Department (now called the School of Art). There he became professor and head of the printmaking program until his death.

=== Family ===
McKeeby and Ana McKeeby were married from 1964 to 1981, with two sons. Upon McKeeby's death on November 3, 1984, in Knoxville, Tennessee of diabetes, he left sons Paulo and Neal, who had influenced his imagery.

== Career ==
=== Educator ===
As an educator, McKeeby taught all levels and aspects of printmaking during his tenure. Students in his printmaking classes learned lithography, engraving, viscosity printing, linocut, wood engraving, collagraphy, screen printing and monotyping. His expertise and teaching style was epitomized by then Art Department Head, Donald F. Kurka, as being 'dedicated to a professional standard of printmaking' and having 'a high tolerance toward divergent attitudes'. Influencing McKeeby was his education and contemporary printmakers pushing technical experimentation. In support of this McKeeby hosted workshops with academic and professional printmakers, such as Donald Saff, for student benefit. In 1981 the university built a new Art & Architecture building; it was opportunity for McKeeby to design a state-of-the-art printshop in support of teaching and creation. Subsequent Printmaking Professor, Beauvais Lyons, credited McKeeby's open studio design that accommodates traditional and experimental techniques in a 2015 statement "The open plan encourages a climate of experimentation and the use of all techniques". Further realization of the concept became part of "the incorporation of computer methods in print education".

=== Artist ===
McKeeby's work was dominated by black and white lithographs. His interest lead him to personally advance what had nearly become a dying art of stone lithography. Drawing was essential for McKeeby, evidenced in the retrospective exhibit title, however, he often used experimentation techniques such as acetone transfer of printed images.

Early works incorporated transfer images with drawn compositions. His lifetime of work defied singular categorization; Art Historian Dale G Cleaver described McKeeby's art as 'posited dualities of existence: the contrasts of good and evil, compassion and violence, mechanical and organic, esoteric and mundane' which 'didn't fit any contemporary styles'. McKeeby's art was also referred to as puckish, mischievously playful. His interest spanned social issues, the natural world, language and through his personal use of imagery he achieved humor and satire. McKeeby's creative process was observed and commented upon by fellow printmaker, Brian R. Wells, as 'He was absorbed in the difference between improvisation and thinking a piece through'.

Career-long McKeeby was active in exhibit competition and shown by invitation, his record was regional, national and international; he was awarded the Chairman's Prize at the 1983 International Biennial Print Exhibit ROC in Taipei, Taiwan. McKeeby was described as prodigious by fellow Art Department faculty F. Clark Stewart and in total McKeeby amassed 200 group exhibitions and 19 one—man shows over twenty-two years.

=== Posthumous Retrospective ===
Indicative of McKeeby's energy and inertia, and at the time of his sudden death, the beginnings of an invitational show of printmakers and their student's work entitled "Printmakers Select Printmakers" was in progress. The Art Department with Gallery Directory Sam Yates' guidance from having worked with McKeeby on the invitational, realized the show in McKeeby's honor February 22- March 16, 1985.

Donald F Kurka wrote in dedication "Ironically, with his untimely death in November 1984, he unwittingly created his own memorial and final tribute to the major passion of his life: printmaking. It would be hard to imagine a more appropriate way to honor and exemplify his lifelong commitment to the field than to bring together the work of some of America's best printmakers and the work of some of their present and former students. His respect and support for his printmaking colleagues across the nation and, in turn, their influence on a new generation of printmakers demonstrate through the exhibition, Byron's devotion to printmaking in America and its future.

His life's work centered around making prints, teaching others to make prints and supporting his fellow printmakers. An artist's artist, a teacher's teacher, as a totally committed colleague, Byron had few equals. His personal integrity and the force of his dedication made all of us work harder, be truer to the best in ourselves and, above all, make art, not just talk art. He selected this invitational show on those same principles - choosing people who are equally engaged in their art as demonstrated through the quality of what they produce."

In 1986 the Ewing Gallery, School of Art at the University of Tennessee at Knoxville, mounted a posthumous retrospective exhibit entitled Byron McKeeby : prints and drawings from 1964-1984 held February 16 - March 20, 1986. The exhibit comprised sixty-six framed works selected from McKeeby's personal oeuvre by Art Historian Dale G. Cleaver who also wrote the catalog essay; the exhibit was coordinated by Gallery Director Sam Yates. After opening in Knoxville, the exhibit traveled primarily through the southeast. An exhibit catalog was produced featuring a six-page essay with 20 black and white plates. The color cover reproduction is of a 1979 McKeeby viscosity print, Untitled(frog).

Additionally McKeeby was honored during the 20th Annual Southern Graphics Council Conference, March 19–21, 1992, with a show of thirty retrospective prints. A reception and talk, 'A Tribute To Byron McKeeby', by Dale Cleaver honored McKeeby's art, leadership, professional accomplishments, high standards and teaching.

Great art concerns itself not with art, but with awakening the human consciousness to itself.

— Byron McKeeby

== Permanent collections ==
- The largest repository of McKeeby artwork is browsable through the Ewing Gallery Permanent Collection

Below is a chronological list of McKeeby artwork in all permanent collections

- 'Untitled' Intaglio, 1963, Dallas Museum of Art, Contemporary Collection
- 'Okina' Lithograph, 1965, Museum of Modern Art, Drawings and Prints
- 'Okina' and 'Monogatari' Lithographs, 1965, National Gallery of Art, additionally Okina at New Mexico's Digital Collections, Tamarind Institute Catalog Raissone, the Norton Simon Museum the Amon Carter Museum of American Art and Monogatari at New Mexico's Digital Collections, Tamarind Institute Catalog Raissone, the Norton Simon Museum the Amon Carter Museum of American Art and the 'Los Angeles County Museum of Art'
- 'Ice Cream Truck' Lithograph, 1966, Ewing Gallery Permanent Collection and the Arts and Science Center for Southeast Arkansas
- 'The Great Operator' Lithograph, 1966, Knoxville Museum of Art
- 'Casi Muerte y Casi Piedre' Lithograph, 1966, Knoxville Museum of Art
- Untitled Oil paint and collage on masonite, 1966, Knoxville Museum of Art
- 'Sometimes We Cast a White Shadow' Intaglio, 1966, Ewing Gallery Permanent Collection
- '15 Ways an Airline' Lithograph, 1967, Ewing Gallery Permanent Collection
- 'Easter Altar' Lithograph, 1967, Ewing Gallery Permanent Collection and the Montgomery Museum of Fine Arts
- 'Intersection' Lithograph, 1967, Brooklyn Museum, Contemporary Art Collection
- 'Untitled (Astronaut Helmet with World Map) Lithograph, 1967, Ewing Gallery Permanent Collection
- 'Untitled (Breastplate with Mechanical Arms and Scissor Hands)' Lithograph, 1968, Ewing Gallery Permanent Collection
- 'Crab' Lithograph, 1968, Knoxville Museum of Art
- 'One Ticket Airline', Lithograph, 1968, Brigham Young University Museum of Art
- 'Row Row Row' Lithograph, 1968, Ewing Gallery Permanent Collection
- 'X-U2' Lithograph, 1968, Knoxville Museum of Art
- 'Angry Rabbits' Graphite Drawing, 1969, Chrysler Museum of Art
- 'Biafra' Lithograph, 1969, Ewing Gallery Permanent Collection
- 'Black Garuda' Lithograph, 1969, Knoxville Museum of Art
- 'Study for All Bullets are Alike' Drawing (graphite, magazine transfer and litho crayon on paper), 1969, Kruizenga Art Museum
- 'Hey Diddle Fiddle' Lithograph, 1970, Georgia State Art Collection, High Resolution Image
- 'Untitled (Self Portrait with Prints)' Lithograph, 1971, Ewing Gallery Permanent Collection
- 'Light Bugs' Lithograph, 1972, Ewing Gallery Permanent Collection
- 'Scissors and Tred' Color Lithograph, 1972, Ewing Gallery Permanent Collection
- 'Thermometer' Lithograph, 1972, Tennessee Arts Commission Permanent Collection
- 'Hatters' Lithograph, 1973, Ewing Gallery Permanent Collection
- 'Trinity' Lithograph, 1973, Ewing Gallery Permanent Collection
- '22 Collection' Lithograph, 1974, Ewing Gallery Permanent Collection
- 'Holding Line' Lithograph, 1974, Ewing Gallery Permanent Collection
- 'Pince Nez' Lithograph, 1974, Ewing Gallery Permanent Collection
- 'Reclining Line' Lithograph, 1974, Ewing Gallery Permanent Collection
- 'Untitled (Fish)' Lithograph, 1974, Ewing Gallery Permanent Collection
- 'Listen' Color Lithograph, 1975, Ewing Gallery Permanent Collection
- 'Murex' Lithograph, 1975, Ewing Gallery Permanent Collection
- 'Vanishing Word' Lithograph, 1975, Ewing Gallery Permanent Collection
- 'Untitled, Two Boar-Like Animals' 1976, Lithograph, Ewing Gallery Permanent Collection
- 'Balloon' Lithograph, 1978, Ewing Gallery Permanent Collection
- 'Untitled (4 and 20 Blackbirds)' Lithograph, 1978, Ewing Gallery Permanent Collection
- 'Hopscoth 2' Lithograph, 1978, Ewing Gallery Permanent Collection
- 'Key' Lithograph, 1978, Ewing Gallery Permanent Collection
- 'Locked Collection' Lithograph, 1978, Ewing Gallery Permanent Collection
- 'Popcorn' Lithograph, 1978, Ewing Gallery Permanent Collection
- 'Which Lens I View' Lithograph, 1979, Ewing Gallery Permanent Collection
- 'Untitled (Frog)' Intaglio (viscosity print), 1979, Ewing Gallery Permanent Collection
- 'Adolescence' Intaglio, 1980, Ewing Gallery Permanent Collection
- 'Armadomino' Intaglio, 1980, Ewing Gallery Permanent Collection
- 'Weight' Intaglio, 1981, Newcomb Art Museum of Tulane
- 'Infant Time' Intaglio, 1982, Ewing Gallery Permanent Collection
- 'Decoy' Woodcut, 1982, Ewing Gallery Permanent Collection
- 'Archdetriumphe' Lithograph, 1983, National Taiwan Museum of Arts
- 'Waiting Season' Intaglio, 1983, Newcomb Art Museum of Tulane
- 'Untitled (Self-Portrait With Masks)' Lithograph, 1983, Ewing Gallery Permanent Collection
- 'Untitled (Flute)' Lithograph, 1984, Newcomb Art Museum of Tulane
- 'Untitled (The American Farmer Can Grow Just About Anything) Lithograph, 1984, Ewing Gallery Permanent Collection

Without Date

- 'Untitled (Giant Bird Head)' Lithograph, no date, Newcomb Art Museum of Tulane
- 'Untitled (Bird in Hand, Bird on Thumb)' Intaglio, no date, Ewing Gallery Permanent Collection
- 'Untitled (Hands and Piano Keys)' Woodcut, no date, Ewing Gallery Permanent Collection
- 'Untitled (Man Facing Chair)' Intaglio, no date, Ewing Gallery Permanent Collection
- 'Untitled (Man Facing Chair With A Bird)' Intaglio, no date, Ewing Gallery Permanent Collection
- 'Untitled (Polar Bears On Cubes)' and 'Untitled (Polar Bear On Cubes)' Woodcuts, no date, Ewing Gallery Permanent Collection
- 'Untitled (Polar Bears Nose to Nose)' Lithograph, no date, Ewing Gallery Permanent Collection
- 'Untitled (Sheep and Hurdler)' Intaglio, no date, Ewing Gallery Permanent Collection
- 'Untitled (Three Flowers Rising From A Box)' Intaglio, no date, Ewing Gallery Permanent Collection
- 'Untitled (Three Monkeys)' Lithograph, no date, Ewing Gallery Permanent Collection
