= Anna Frances Simpson =

American artist

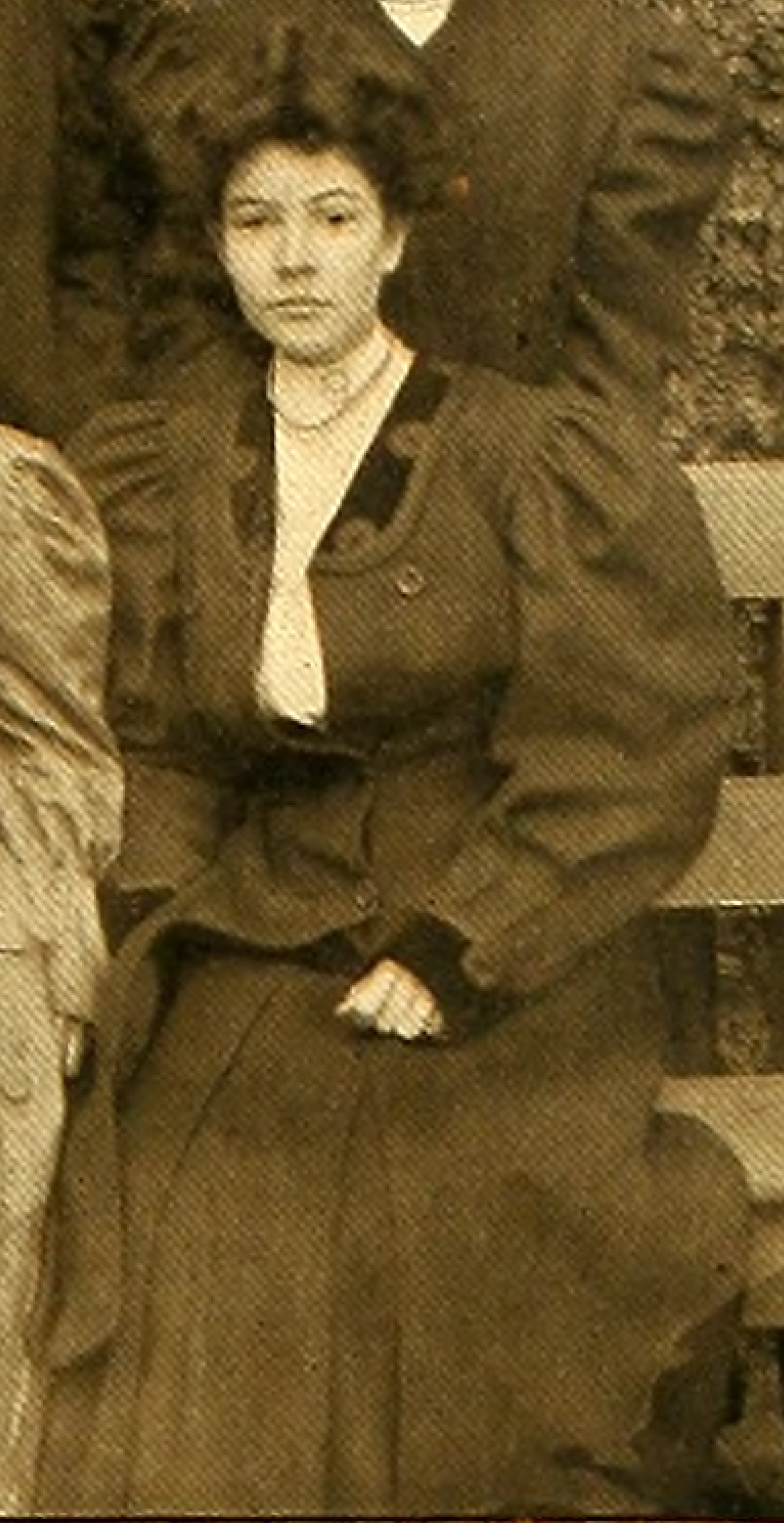
- Born: Anna Frances Connor Simpson; August 14, 1880; New Orleans, Louisiana
- Died: June 26, 1930 (aged 49); New Orleans, Louisiana
- Education: H. Sophie Newcomb Memorial College
- Known for: Pottery
- Movement: Newcomb Pottery, Arts and Crafts movement

Anna Frances Connor Simpson (August 14, 1880 – June 26, 1930) was an American artist associated with Newcomb Pottery.

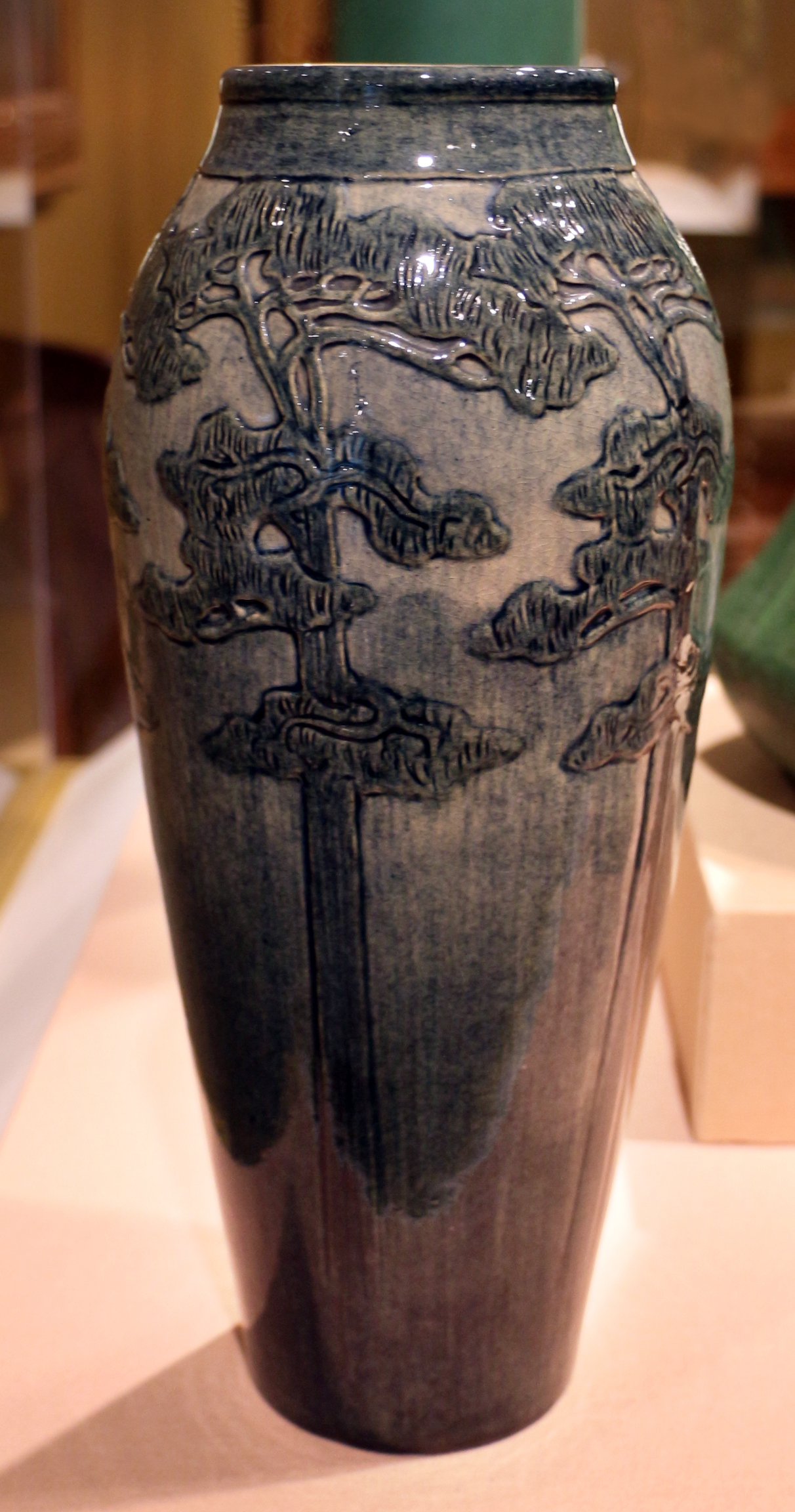
Pottery Vase by Joseph Fortune Meyer with decoration by Anna Frances Simpson, 1908.

== Biography ==
Anna Frances (“Fanny” or “Fannie”) Connor (“Coonie”) Simpson was born to Joseph Forsyth Simpson and Susan Connor Brickell on August 14, 1880, in New Orleans, Louisiana, the second of their five children. Simpson received her early education from French-speaking nuns and entered the H. Sophie Newcomb Memorial College in 1902, receiving a Diploma in Art in 1906. After two additional years of post-graduate work at the college, Simpson became an Art Craftsman at Newcomb Pottery in 1908, a capacity in which she served until 1929, excepting a one-year period from 1923–24. During her time working for the pottery, she was paid by the piece until 1928, when she began earning an annual salary of $1,800. Described by family members as patient and kind, Simpson never married and, following the death of her father in 1914, she remained living with her widowed mother. Simpson died from cancer in New Orleans on June 26, 1930, at the age of forty-nine.

== Artistic Legacy ==
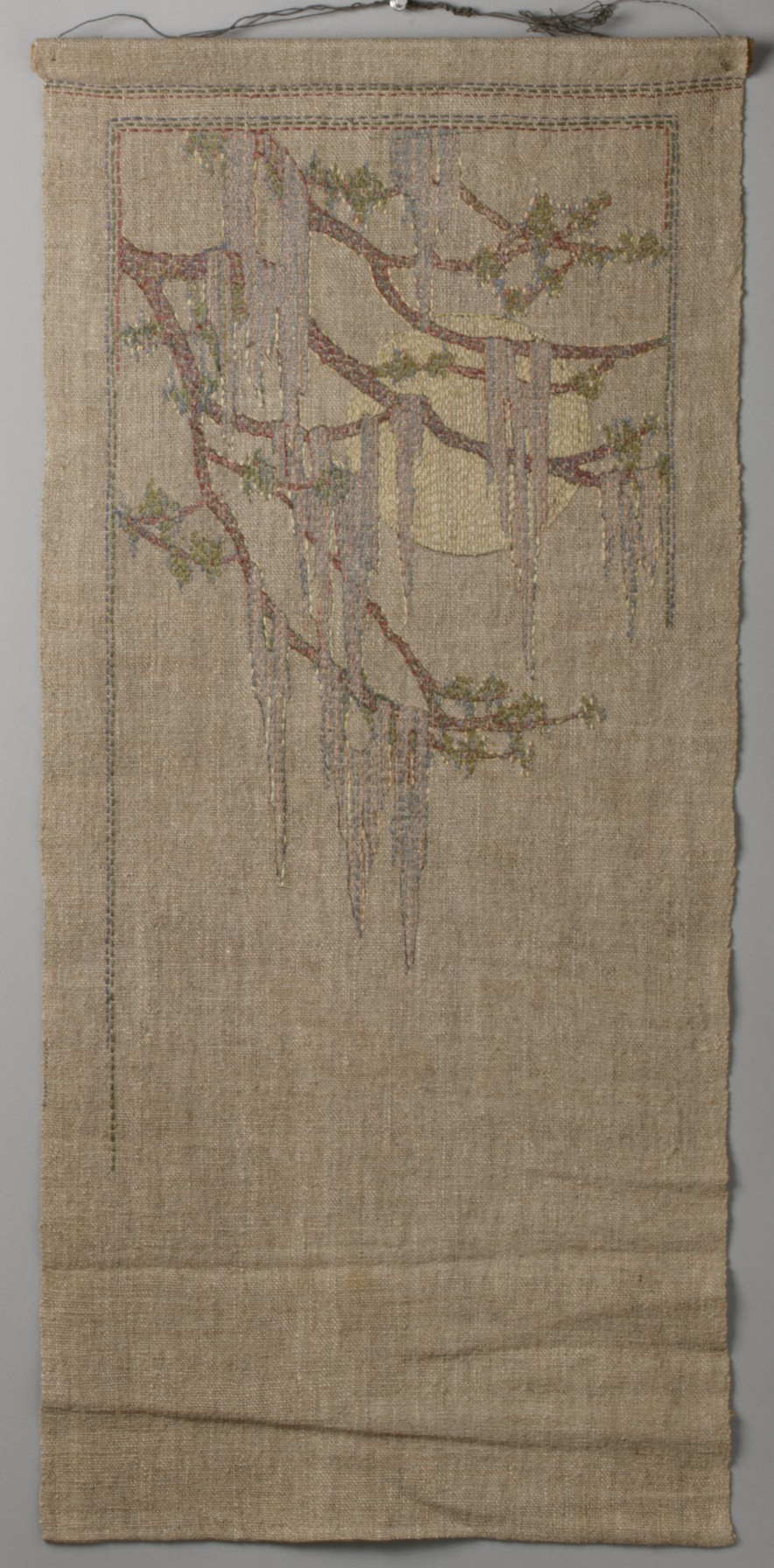
"Cypress in Spring," embroidery by Anna Frances Simpson, c. 1910–1929.

Simpson was a highly productive artist who worked in multiple media, including pottery decoration, embroidery, and printmaking. Early designs at Newcomb (1896–c. 1909) had been influenced by European Art Nouveau, and their pottery featured a clear, high-gloss glaze. Simpson was pivotal in charting a new direction for the company after she became an Art Craftsman: “Under the lead of Sadie Irvine and Anna Frances Simpson, the decoration evolved towards a more impressionistic palette.” During Newcomb’s transitional (c. 1909–c. 1914) and late (c. 1915–1940) periods, themes inspired by Louisiana’s landscape were routinely used as decoration, typically floral designs and bayou scenes. Simpson excelled at these motifs, notably the ever-popular “Moon and Moss” design in blue and green with a matte finish that has become a hallmark of Newcomb Pottery. Simpson’s “Moon and Moss” pieces were often richly carved and featured a “greater complexity of form and density of decoration, so that her pottery sometimes resembled tapestry.”

The potter Paul E. Cox, who worked at Newcomb Pottery from 1910 until 1918 and developed new glazes and improved the quality of the clay body used by the decorators, reflected in 1934 that:

In the opinion of the writer, Miss Sadie Agnes Estelle Irvine was the greatest of the decorators in the history of the enterprise. A prolific but less inspired designer was Miss Fannie Simpson, who died a few years ago. Miss Henrietta Bailey never gave all of her time to pottery decoration but more of her ware went into prize-winning shows than her general average of work would predict. These three women have been the “standbys” of the Pottery.

== Exhibitions and Museums ==
Given her productivity, it is no surprise that “Simpson participated in almost every Newcomb pottery exhibit in her lifetime.” Some representative exhibitions in which Simpson’s work was shown include:

1908–10: Annual Exhibition of Original Designs for Decorations and Examples of Arts Crafts Having Distinct Artistic Merit, Art Institute of Chicago (examples of her embroidery and pottery were shown each of these three years).

1911: Eighteenth Annual Exhibition of the New York Society of Keramic Arts.

1915: Panama-Pacific International Exposition, San Francisco (examples of her embroidery and pottery were shown; Newcomb College received the grand prize for its model room display at this exposition, which included pieces by Simpson).

1924: Annual Exhibition of the Art Association of New Orleans (examples of her embroidery and pottery were shown).

1929: Southern States Art League’s Ninth Annual Convention and Exhibition in San Antonio (examples of her embroidery, printmaking, and pottery were shown; her vase featuring the Espanol pattern was awarded a silver medal for best pottery).

1930: Exhibition of the Work of New Orleans Potters, Museum of Fine Arts, Houston, December 7–28, 1930 (this exhibit, six months after Simpson’s death, included six examples of her work).

Examples of Simpson’s works can be found in the Metropolitan Museum of Art; the Museum of Fine Arts, Houston; the Fine Arts Museums of San Francisco; the Rhode Island School of Design Museum; and the Los Angeles County Museum of Art; among others.
