= Cluster No. 13 =

1973 painting by Ida Kohlmeyer

Cluster #13
- Artist: Ida Kohlmeyer
- Year: 1973
- Medium: Oil on canvas
- Dimensions: 113 cm × 127 cm (44.5 in × 50 in)
- Location: Memorial Art Gallery, Rochester, New York

Cluster #13 is oil on canvas painting by Ida Kohlmeyer with the dimensions of 44.5 x 50 in (113 x 127 cm). It is part of a larger body of work, known as the cluster series. The Cluster series is one of her 4 main bodies of work. The painting is located at the Memorial Art Gallery in Rochester, New York. It was acquired as a gift from Philip Alan Selwyn and Karen Peller Selwyn. The painting adheres to Kohlmeyer's style of painting, which draws from abstract expressionism.

== Ida Kohlmeyer ==
Ida Kohlmeyer (1912–1997) was an abstract expressionist artist who primarily created drawings, paintings and sculptures.

=== Early life and education ===
She was born and raised in New Orleans, Louisiana, and earned her BA English in 1933 from Newcomb College at Tulane University. Komlmeyer began her career as an artist in her late 30s, when he returned Newcomb College and earned her MFA in 1956.

=== Artistic influences ===
The development of her personal visual language, which can be seen across her body of works was mainly influenced by Hans Hoffman and Mark Rothko. Additionally, their influence can be seen in the bright, vivid colors along with the combinations of abstract organic forms in conjunction with geometrical shapes. Kohlmeyer's use of abstractions and rectangles was mainly derived from the influence of Rothko. Her studies with Hoffman were pivotal in her transition into non-objective, abstract art, marking a shift into looser interpretations that relied on form and gesture to convey feelings.

== Cluster #13 (part of the Cluster series of works) ==
=== Structure ===
Cluster #13 is composed of a grid form centered on the canvas. The painting consists of an 8x6 grid of rectangles on a white canvas, with each of the gridded rectangles having superimposed brush strokes. Each rectangle of the grid consists of a background color with superimposed brush strokes of a different color. Kohlmeyer uses a combination of geometric and fluid, organic shapes. Form and gesture are also key elements, primarily seen within the individual gridded rectangles and their superimposed strokes. The white canvas creates regions of negative space between the rectangles that make up the grid. The superimposed brush strokes are primarily confined to the individual gridded spaces, but often flow into the negative spaces. This is characteristic of Kohlmeyer's other works in the cluster series, which are composed of grid of forms that can stand alone within its enclosed space but also interacts with the surrounding grid form.

=== Style and visual language ===
Kohlmeyer utilizes an expressive style of painting which relates and exemplifies her visual language that can be seen in the broader collection of her work. Cluster #13 is composed of superimposed gestural forms into a gridded form. Motifs include broad strokes, "x" shaped strokes, horizontal and vertical strokes, circles, and other geometric forms. Her visual language, which can be seen through not only the symbols, but her use of contrasting colors create a sense of cohesiveness as well as contrast. Kohlmeyer's visual language is heavily influenced by Mayan and Meso-American painting and molded pictoglyphs.

== Interpretations ==
=== Cluster series of paintings ===
Cluster #13 is part of a bigger series of works known as the Cluster series; this series is made up of individual abstractions that can be referenced as standalone or as part of a broader body of work. The Cluster series is highly tied together by her use of color.

=== Interpretations visual language ===
Kohlmeyer's visual language is grounded in non-objectivity and in gesture and form rather than in specific meanings, which leaves her work up to the viewer to interpret. In a sense, her visual language is a form of symbolism due to its role as a personal method of communication. This visual language can be seen across the surfaces of her general body of art, and usually appear in stacked forms or as isolated sculptures.

== Provenance ==
Cluster #13 was acquired by the Memorial Art Gallery in 2017.
