= Mary Given Sheerer =

American ceramicist (1865–1954)

- Born: Sarah Given Sheerer; 1865; Covington, Kentucky
- Died: 1954 (aged 88–89); Cincinnati, Ohio
- Resting place: Highland Cemetery, Fort Mitchell, Kentucky
- Education: Art Academy of Cincinnati
- Known for: Pottery
- Movement: Newcomb Pottery; Arts and Crafts movement
- Website: tulane.edu/~wc/pottery/

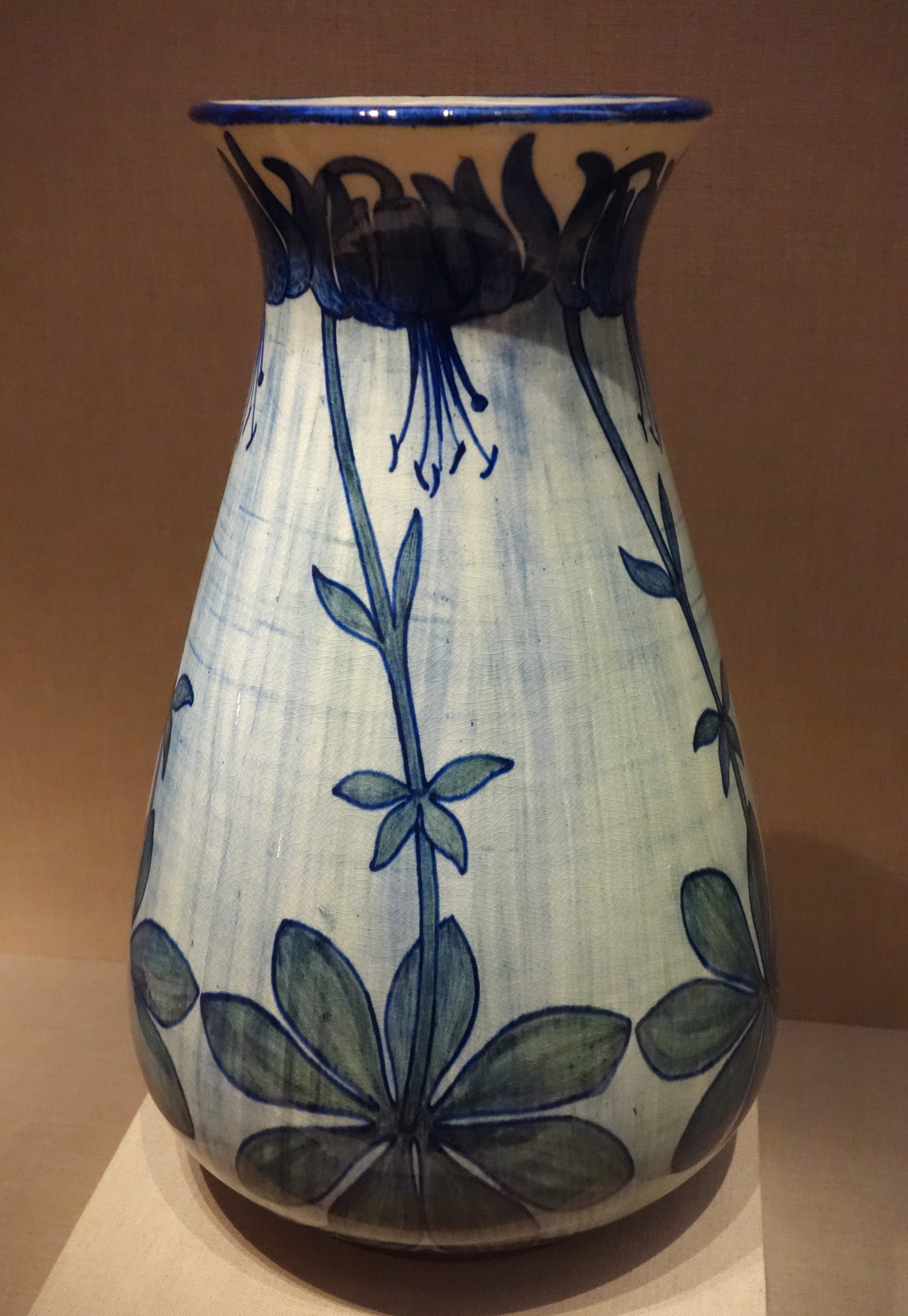
Newcomb Pottery vase by Mary Given Sheerer and Joseph Meyer

Mary Given Sheerer (1865–1954) was an American ceramicist, designer, and art educator, best known for her affiliation with the Newcomb Pottery project at H. Sophie Newcomb Memorial College, now part of Tulane University.

== Biography ==
Sheerer was born in Covington, Kentucky in 1865. She studied art in Massachusetts, the Art Students League of New York, under Hugh Breckenridge at the Pennsylvania Academy of Fine Arts and graduated from the Art Academy of Cincinnati. While living in Covington in the early 1890s, she worked at Rookwood Pottery Company. In 1894, Newcomb art faculty founders William Woodward and Ellsworth Woodward made Sheerer their first faculty hire. She became a full professor in 1903. From 1903 to 1909, Sheerer was appointed as professor of pottery design and supervisor of pottery decoration; her official title was Professor of Pottery and China Decoration. In 1909, Sheerer was promoted to Assistant Director of Pottery. Sheerer was a member of the Cincinnati Museum Association, Cincinnati Crafters Club, New Orleans Art Association, Cincinnati Women's Art Club, and the American Federation of Arts. Her works were displayed at the Louisiana Purchase Exposition in 1904, and the Panama–Pacific International Exposition held in San Francisco in 1915. She was noted for designing glazes and pottery decoration.

Sheerer was responsible for setting standards and guiding Newcomb Pottery's day-to-day production.

She gave technical advice to Mississippi ceramicist Peter Anderson.

Sheerer retired from the Newcomb faculty in 1931. Post Sheerer's retirement from Newcomb Pottery, she was awarded as a fellow of the American Ceramic Society on March 11, 1931. She died in December 1954 in Cincinnati and is buried at Highland Cemetery, Fort Mitchell, Kentucky.

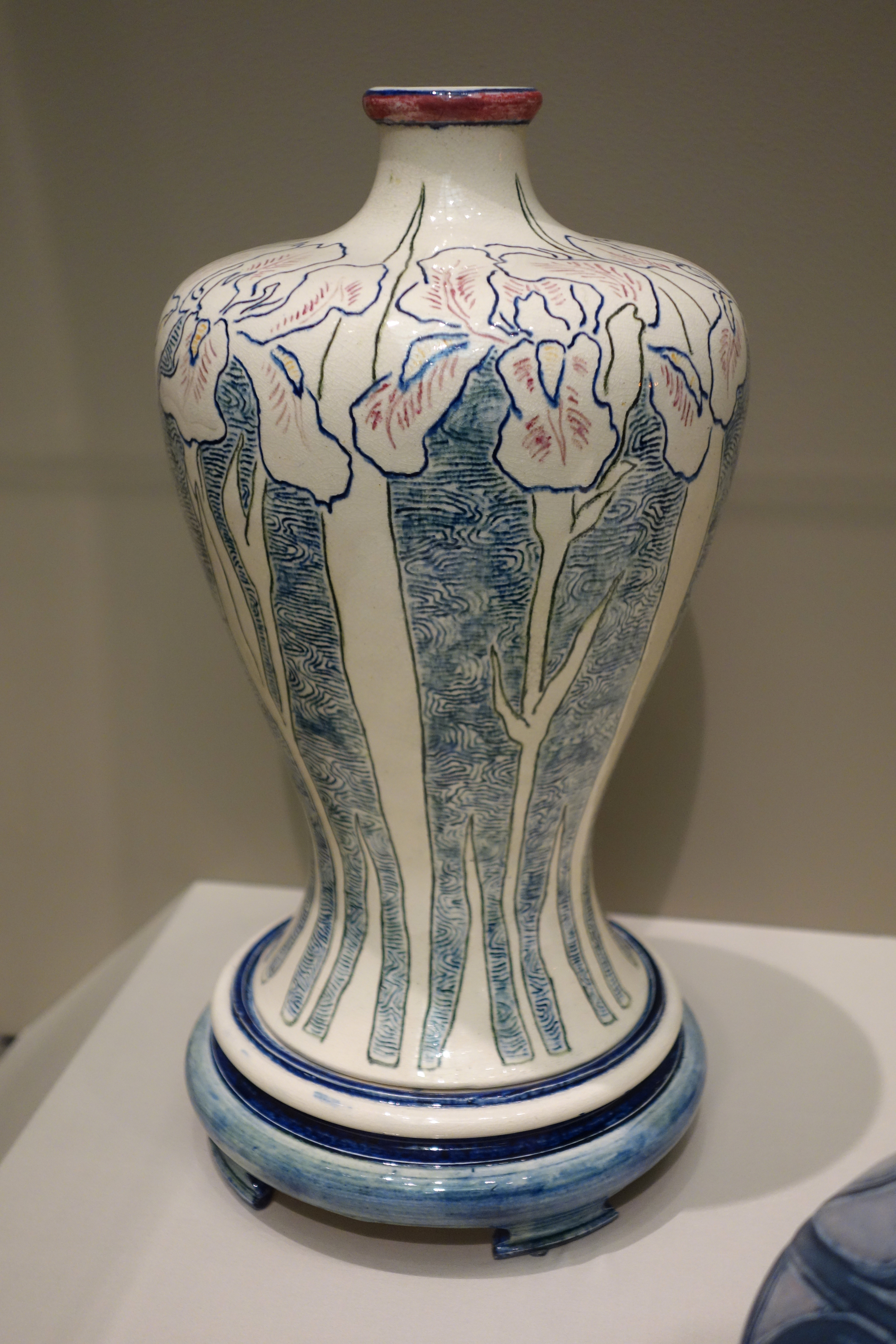
A Newcomb Pottery vase by Sheerer displayed in the Cincinnati Art Museum.

The "Spanish Dagger Plate" is the product of collaboration between decorator, Mary Sheerer, and potter, Joseph Meyer.
