= Harriet Coulter Joor =

American artist

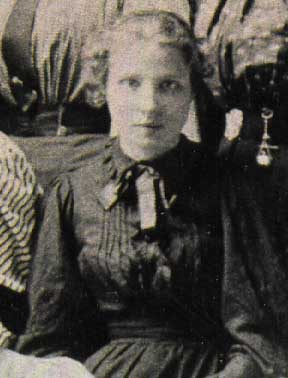
- Born: January 20, 1875; Texas, United States
- Died: March 28, 1965 (aged 90); Lafayette, Louisiana, United States
- Education: Newcomb College
- Known for: Pottery

Harriet Coulter Joor (1875–1965) was an American artist, writer, textile and ceramics designer, and pottery decorator. Joor was among the earliest graduates of H. Sophie Newcomb Memorial College, and was one of the original producers of Newcomb Pottery.

== Early life ==
Harriet "Hattie" Coulter Joor was born in January 1875 to Joseph F. Joor, a professor of botany at Tulane University, and E. H. Joor. Joor came to New Orleans in 1888 when her father was appointed Assistant Curator of Tulane University's Natural History Museum, and she enrolled in courses at H. Sophie Newcomb Memorial College as an adolescent.

== Education ==
Harriet Joor enrolled in Newcomb College in 1887, and was among the first students in the Normal Art program. She received her Bachelor of Science degree in 1895 and was then enrolled as a Special Art Student from 1896 to 1900. In the summer of 1900, Joor was awarded a $125 scholarship to attend Arthur Wesley Dow's summer art institute in Ipswich. Joor then returned to New Orleans to study Graduate Art at Newcomb College from 1900 to 1901.

On her time at Newcomb College, Joor wrote:

. . . many memories of those beginning days of Newcomb in the tiny vine-covered brick building that housed the college heating plant! We were so like a little family group the few of us working at our tables with Mr. Meyer thumping out his vases at the wheel beside us, and the big round kiln looming up in the other corner of the room, with the splashed glazing table beside it! I loved so I sued to linger on and on, forgetting everything but the jar under my hand . . .

Joor participated in the hand-modeled pottery practice, also seen in the work of Leona Nicholson. Joor's pottery that was not made on the wheel included objects like tea sets and small cones.

== Career ==
After graduating from Newcomb College, Joor taught pottery at the University of Chicago's School of Education. In 1906, she took a position as a staff writer at The Craftsman. After leaving Chicago, Joor set up a homestead in Ada, South Dakota between 1911 and 1912, living in a sod house. In 1923, Joor began teaching art at Southwestern Louisiana in Lafayette, now University of Louisiana at Lafayette.

=== Exhibitions ===
Joor exhibited around the country, and in 1900 in Paris at the Paris Exposition Universelle. In 1904, three pieces of Joor's pottery were exhibited at the Louisiana Purchase Exposition in St. Louis, Missouri. Joor's pottery was included in the 2014 Smithsonian survey Women, Art, and Social Change: The Newcomb Pottery Enterprise, which toured nationally. In 1908, five pieces of embroidery by Joor were listed with the color, motif, and price in the Catalogue of the Fifth Annual Exhibition of the Art Association of New Orleans, Newcomb Art Gallery, Corner of Camp and Sixth Streets, March 14–28, 1908, including one bag and four scarves.

== Recognition ==
Harriet Joor received the Neill Medal for her watercolor paintings.

== Artistic legacy ==
Works by Harriet Joor are in the permanent collections of a number of art museums, including The Newcomb Art Museum, The New Orleans Museum of Art, and The Museum of Fine Arts, Houston, among others. In 2013, her work was included in, "Women, Art and Social Change: The Newcomb Pottery Enterprise" at the Newcomb Art Gallery.

== Auction history ==
A vase decorated with incised gardenias by Harriet Coulter was listed by Jean M. Bragg Gallery as Catalog No. 94 for $18,000 in 1998.
