= Mignon Faget =

American jewelry designer

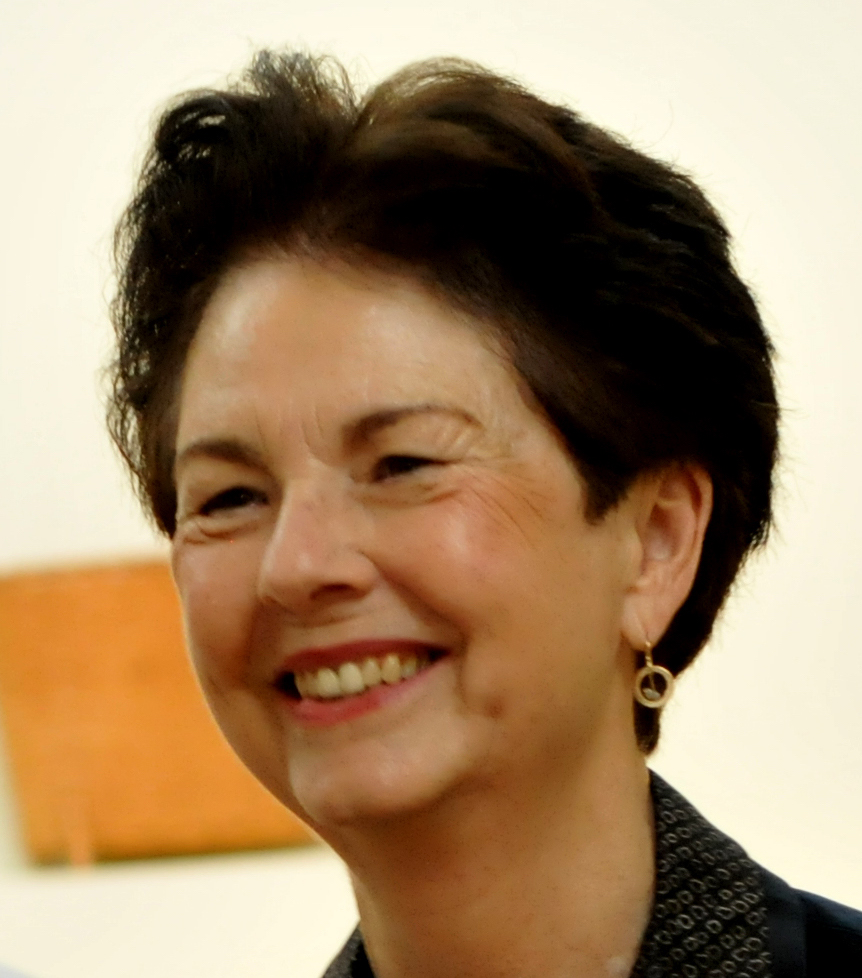
Faget in 2010

Mignon Faget (born November 1933) is a jewelry designer based in her native New Orleans, Louisiana. Faget has long been acknowledged as one of New Orleans' premier designers of fine jewelry.

Her family settled in the city in the late 18th century after leaving Haiti. Painter Jacqueline Humphries is her daughter. Jewelry designer John Humphries is her son.

== Early life and education ==
Mignon Faget was raised in a Creole French downtown family in New Orleans, by her father, a doctor from the West Indies and her mother of French descent. Mignon Faget has a sister of 16 years her eldest and a brother of 9 years her eldest.

Faget attended the Roman Catholic Academy of the Sacred Heart as a young woman. She credits much of her talent to her years at H. Sophie Newcomb Memorial College where she graduated in 1955 with a Bachelor of Fine Arts and a concentration in sculpture. While at Newcomb College she studied under Jules Struppeck (1915–1993), Pat Travigno (b. 1922) and Sarah "Sadie" Irvine (1887–1970). Faget feels a course entitled "Design in Nature" taught by Robert Durant "Robin" Feild (1893–1979) had a major influence on her future career. She additionally studied at the Académie de la Grande Chaumière in Paris, the Parsons School of Design in New York and print-making at St. Mary's Dominican College in New Orleans.

== Career ==
Faget launched her first ready-to-wear line in 1969 in a studio in the Riverbend neighborhood of New Orleans. Faget studied sculpture at Newcomb then transitioned to design at D.H. Holmes Department store. While making a belt one day, Faget melted down wedding gifts into a design reminiscent of sand dollars and the sea. When customers saw the design, they asked to wear the shells as pendants, inspiring her to look further into creating accessories. Since then, Faget has worked primarily in jewelry, creating sculptural jewelry inspired by nature and animals specifically, from Louisiana. She renovated a barge board cottage and it became the early headquarters housing her studio, jewelry workshop and retail gallery for many years. In 1997, she renovated a neo-classical former bank building to house her company, in addition to having galleries in New Orleans, Metairie, and Baton Rouge. After opening her new facility, she donated her original location on Dublin Street to the Preservation Resource Center.

=== Collections and commissions ===
Faget has designed special commissions for various organizations, including the Preservation Resource Center, Desire NOLA, Woodlands Trail and Park, H. Sophie Newcomb Memorial College, the Louisiana Philharmonic Orchestra, the New Orleans Museum of Art, the Junior League of New Orleans, the Louisiana Nature Center at the Audubon Nature Institute, and the Friends of the Audubon Zoo, among others. Her designs for Newcomb College feature the motif of the oak tree, a prominent symbol in the college's history. She has also designed jewelry for various New Orleans Mardi Gras krewes for their annual balls.

=== Exhibitions ===
Faget's work has appeared in various galleries across the country. In 1976 and 1980 she had solo showings in Kruger Gallery in New York City at which she showcased her latest designs.

=== Inspiration ===
Her jewelry is often inspired by her local environment, such as New Orleans architecture and culture or based on forms in nature. Faget describes her work as a "crossover between a jeweled accessory and a piece of jewelry". Faget designs by collections and has created works entitled Sea, Romanesque Return, Zea, Animal Crackers, Armament, Schema, among others. Citing a dictionary, Faget herself referred to her work as "biomorphic," meaning "related to, derived from, or incorporating the forms of living beings, used especially of primitive and abstract art." However, she has also made work drawing inspiration from man-made elements such as architecture and place-based culture.

=== Materials ===
She fabricates in gold, sterling silver, bronze, precious, and semi-precious stones. She also designs items for personal and home adornment and gifts.

== Philanthropy ==
After Hurricane Katrina, her business raised over $150,000 in eighteen months, which she donated to artists and arts organizations. Similarly, after BP's Deepwater Horizon oil spill she raised nearly $100,000.

In fall of 2010, Mignon Faget was honored with a retrospective exhibit at the Historic New Orleans Collection entitled Mignon Faget: A Life in Art and Design. The exhibition opened at the Louisiana State Museum Capitol Park in Baton Rouge, Louisiana, November 2011.

=== Accolades ===
2013: Honored as Forum35 Art Melt Louisiana Art Legend

2018: Tulane University Distinguished Alumni Award
