= Newcomb–Tulane College =

College

Newcomb-Tulane College
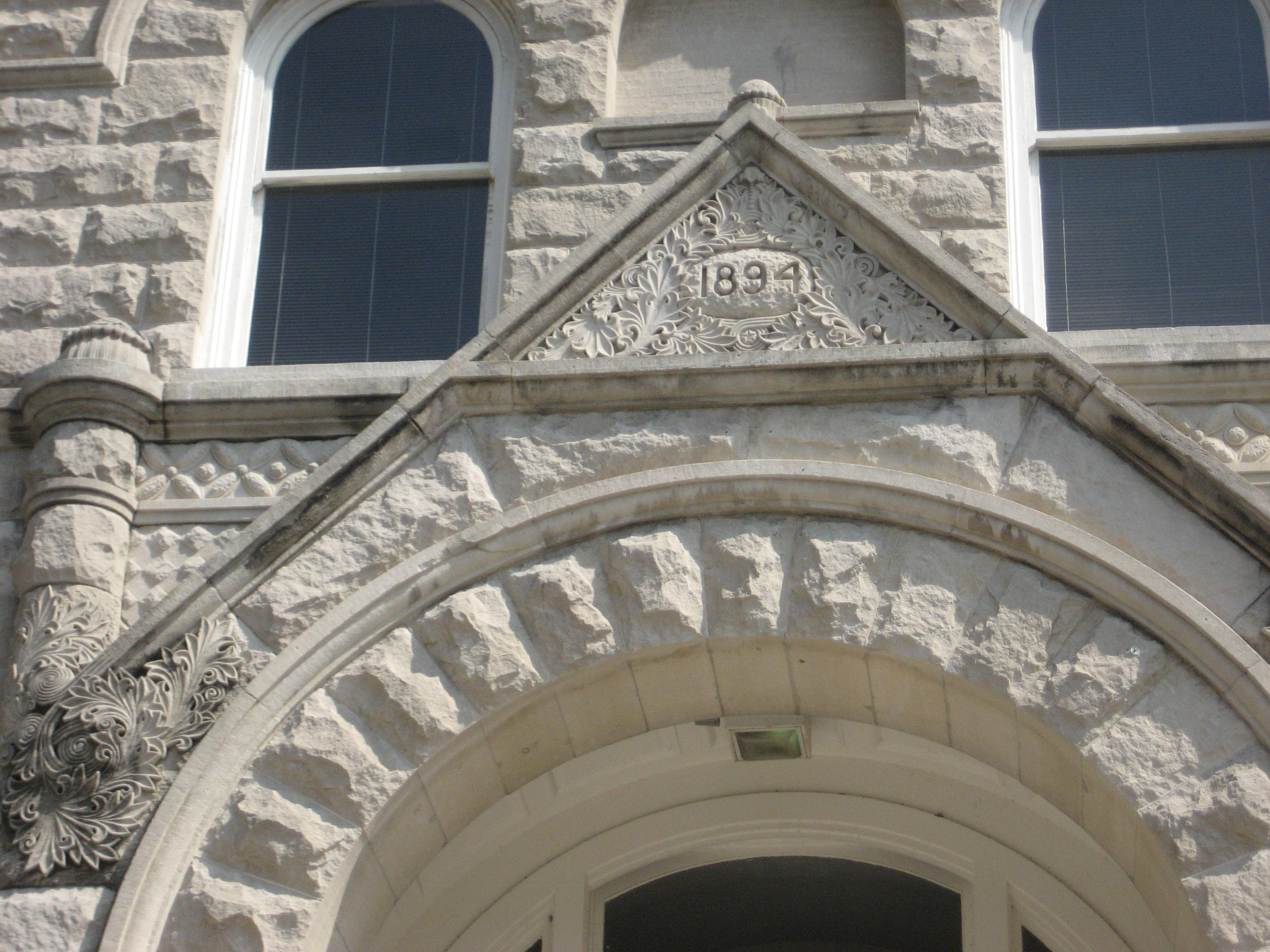
- Type: Private
- Established: 2005
- Dean: Mollye Demosthenidy
- Location: New Orleans, Louisiana, USA
- Campus: Urban
- Website: college.tulane.edu

Newcomb–Tulane College is the undergraduate college of Tulane University, a private university in New Orleans, Louisiana, United States. The college was founded in 2005 through the intra-university merger of the all-male Tulane College and the all-female H. Sophie Newcomb Memorial College.

== Scope ==
Students enrolled in the college pursue programs and degrees offered by the five schools offering classes to undergraduates:

- Tulane School of Architecture
- Freeman School of Business
- Tulane University School of Liberal Arts
- Tulane University School of Public Health and Tropical Medicine
- Tulane University School of Science and Engineering

== See also ==
- H. Sophie Newcomb Memorial College
- Tulane University
