= Ida Kohlmeyer =

American painter and sculptor

- Born: Ida Rittenberg; November 3, 1912; New Orleans, Louisiana
- Died: January 24, 1997 (aged 84); New Orleans, Louisiana
- Known for: Painting, Sculpture
- Spouse: Hugh Kohlmeyer

Ida Rittenberg Kohlmeyer (3 November 1912 – 24 January 1997) was an American painter and sculptor who lived and worked in Louisiana. Kohlmeyer took up painting in her 30s and achieved wide recognition for her work in art museums and galleries throughout the United States. Notably, her work is held by the National Museum of Women in the Arts, the Smithsonian American Art Museum, the Speed Art Museum, the Ogden Museum of Southern Art and the New Orleans Museum of Art. Ms. Kohlmeyer, a member of the Reform Jewish movement, played an active role in the New Orleans Jewish community throughout her life. Touro Synagogue (New Orleans) displays much of her artwork in their synagogue and in the social hall.

== Early life ==
Kohlmeyer, née Rittenberg, was the daughter of Polish immigrants. She earned a Bachelor of Arts in English at Newcomb College, the former women's coordinate college of Tulane University. After graduating from Newcomb, Kohlmeyer married Hugh Kohlmeyer, and the two took their honeymoon to Vera Cruz and Mexico City, Mexico in 1934. It was there that Kohlmeyer became inspired by and interested in the art of South and Central America.

== Early art career, 1950s ==
Kohlmeyer returned to Newcomb/Tulane in 1950 and completed a Master of Fine Arts in painting in 1956. She then studied at the painting school of the New York artist Hans Hofmann, known for his use of color, who influenced her in her decision to give up representational art for abstraction. Her early work was primarily in a gestural style influenced by Holfmann and other Abstract Impressionists, including Arshile Gorky and Mark Rothko, whom she met in New York.

She had her first exhibition at the New Orleans Museum of Art in 1957, and her first exhibition in New York City at the Ruth White Gallery in 1959.

== Later art career, 1970s–1980s ==
Kohlmeyer, inspired by her interest in South American art and the work of Miró developed "...a distinctive vocabulary of hieroglyphs, shapes, and signs, all organized in a loose grid, that hovered among abstraction, writing and emblem." She explored this style throughout her life. The Atlanta High Museum of Art hosted a retrospective of her work in 1972, as did the Mint Museum of Art in Charlotte, NC, which traveled to seven cities in 1984 and 1985.

== End of art career and legacy ==
Kohlmeyer reached the height of her career later in life, completing several major commissions, including a project for the Equitable Life Assurance Society building at 1515 Poydras Avenue and a still-standing major installation of twenty painted metal sculptures for the Audubon Aquarium of the Americas on the Mississippi riverfront, titled Aquatic Colonnade. This sculpture was restored in 2012 after Hurricane Katrina. Kohlmeyer died on January 29, 1997, at Touro Infirmary in New Orleans.

In 2004, the Newcomb Art Gallery organized Systems of Color, an exhibition and accompanying book, dedicated to Kohlmeyer.

The New Orleans Museum of Art celebrated 100 years of Kohlmeyer's career in 2012–2013.

In 2016 her biography was included in the exhibition catalogue Women of Abstract Expressionism organized by the Denver Art Museum.

Cluster #13 from Kohlmeyer's Cluster series is on display at the Memorial Art Gallery in Rochester, NY.
