= Josephine Louise Newcomb =

American philanthropist

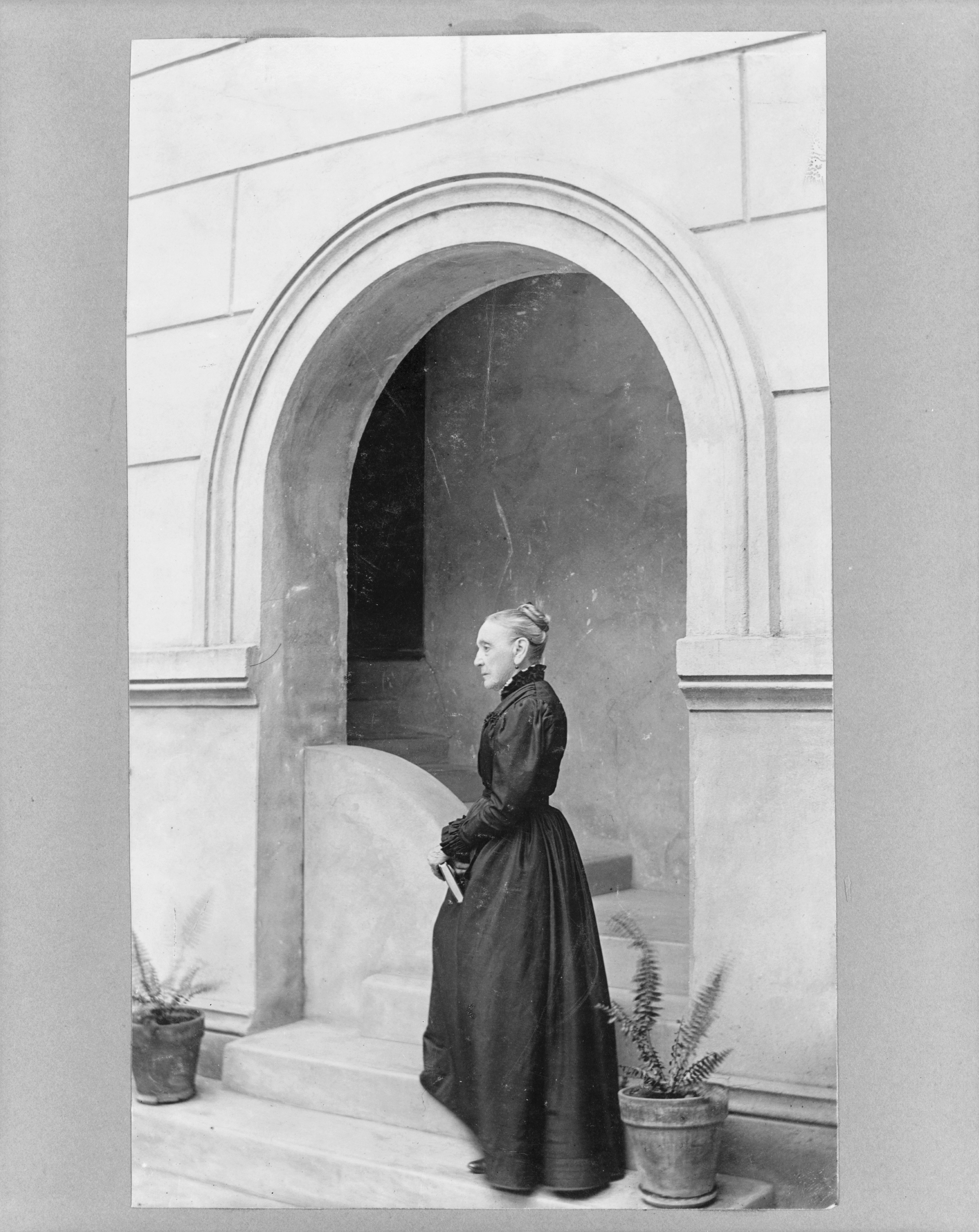
- Born: October 31, 1816; Baltimore, Maryland
- Died: April 7, 1901 (aged 84)
- Occupation: Philanthropist
- Spouse: Warren Newcomb
- Children: Warren Newcomb, Jr., Harriott Sophie Newcomb

Josephine Louise Newcomb (née Le Monnier; October 31, 1816 – April 7, 1901) was the philanthropist whose donations led to the founding of Newcomb College, the coordinate college for women within Tulane University.

== Life ==
Josephine Louise Le Monnier was born in Baltimore on October 31, 1816, to Mary Sophia Waters and Alexander Le Monnier. She received her education in Baltimore and New Orleans. The latter city became her home at age fifteen, after the death of her mother. Other members of the family also lived in New Orleans, including her older sister Eleanor Anne and brother-in-law William Henderson. There, Le Monnier met Warren Newcomb; the couple married in Christ Church Cathedral on December 15, 1845.

They always split their time among various cities, notably New York City and Louisville, Kentucky, where they had a son, Warren, Jr., who died shortly after his birth in 1853. In New York, two years later, the couple had their second child, Harriott Sophie Newcomb. Sophie died in 1870 and her mother searched for many years for a suitable memorial.

Besides her donation to Tulane University for the women's college created in her daughter's name, Josephine Louise Newcomb was interested in a number of other causes and charities.
