= Sadie Irvine =

- Born: Sarah Agnes Estelle Irvine; July 21, 1887; New Orleans, Louisiana
- Died: September 4, 1970 (aged 83)
- Resting place: New Orleans Masonic Cemetery
- Education: H. Sophie Newcomb Memorial College
- Known for: Pottery
- Movement: Newcomb Pottery, Arts and Crafts movement
- Website: www.tulane.edu/~wc/pottery/irvine.html

Sarah Agnes Estelle (Sadie) Irvine (July 21, 1887 - September 4, 1970) was an American artist and educator. Her work is associated with the Newcomb College pottery school, where she studied and taught until her retirement in 1952.

== Biography ==
Irvine was born in New Orleans, Louisiana to Agnes Estelle and Robert William Irvine on July 21, 1887. She attended McDonough High School (later Sophie Wright High School) and subsequently studied at Newcomb College from 1903 to 1906. She was one of the most prolific pottery decorators of Newcomb. Irvine also explored working in embroidery, block prints, watercolors, pastels, and sketches. Her work received many accolades including travel and study scholarships to the Art Students League in New York, Arthur W. Dow's Ipswich summer school, and the Pennsylvania Academy of Fine Arts. From 1908 to 1929, Irvine was listed as an Art Craftsman of Newcomb College, and from 1929 until her retirement in 1952, she taught a wide breadth of classes there as well.

== Work ==
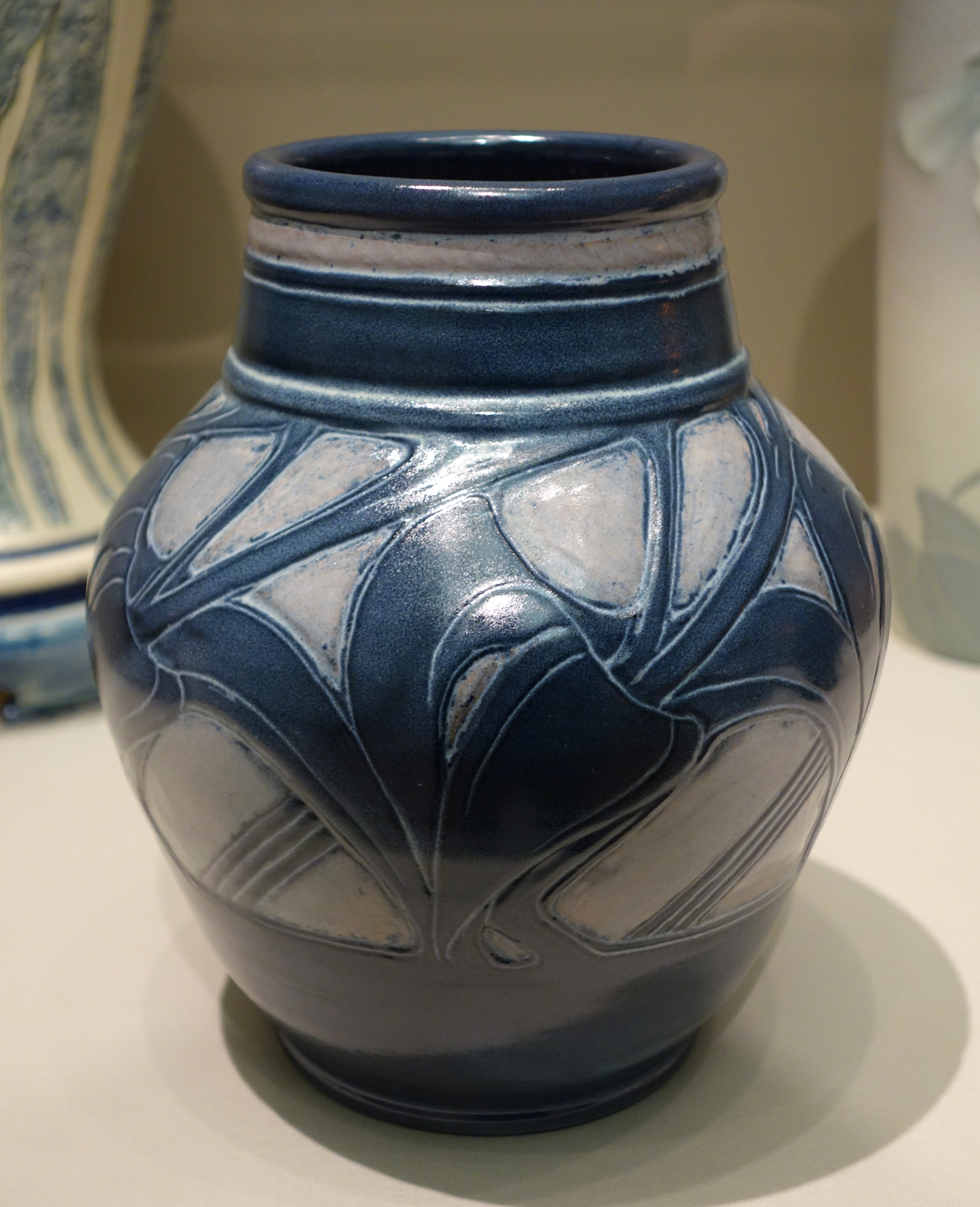

Irvine is best known for her pottery decoration featuring local Louisiana flora, as exemplified by a low relief moss and oak tree decorated vase currently held by the Alexandria Museum of Art. She won numerous prizes for her work such as the Holley Medal traveling scholarship (1908) and the Ellsworth Woodsworth prize for pottery, as well as accolades at exhibits such as those of the New Orleans Art Association and the Delgado Museum of Art.
