= H. Sophie Newcomb Memorial College =

College in New Orleans

Sophie Newcomb College
- Former names: Medical College of Louisiana (1834–1847), University of Louisiana (1847–1884)
- Motto: Non Sibi Sed Suis (Latin)
- Motto in English: "Not for oneself, but for one's own"
- Type: Private
- Established: 1886
- Academic affiliations: AAU
- Endowment: US$807 million (as of June 30, 2009)
- President: Michael Fitts
- Faculty: 1,132
- Undergraduates: 6,749
- Postgraduates: 4,408
- Location: New Orleans, Louisiana, U.S. 29.9353°N 90.1227°W
- Campus: Urban
- Colors: Brown & blue
- Nickname: Live Oak
- Sporting affiliations: NCAA Division I Conference USA
- Mascot: Newcomb's mascot is the Oak tree
- Website: tulane.edu

H. Sophie Newcomb Memorial College was the coordinate women's college of Tulane University, located in New Orleans, Louisiana. It was founded by Josephine Louise Newcomb in 1886 in memory of her daughter.

Newcomb was the first women's coordinate college within a United States university. This model was later used in partnerships such as Pembroke College at Brown University and Barnard College at Columbia University.

== History ==
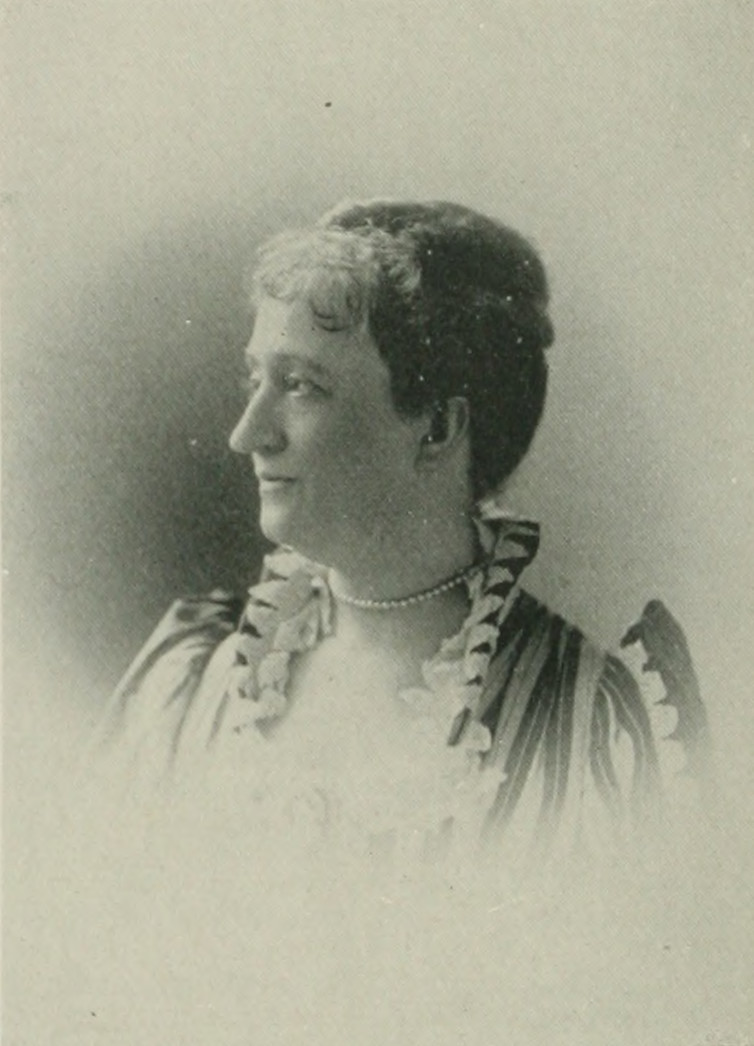
Jennie Coldwell Nixon, chair, English literature, 1887

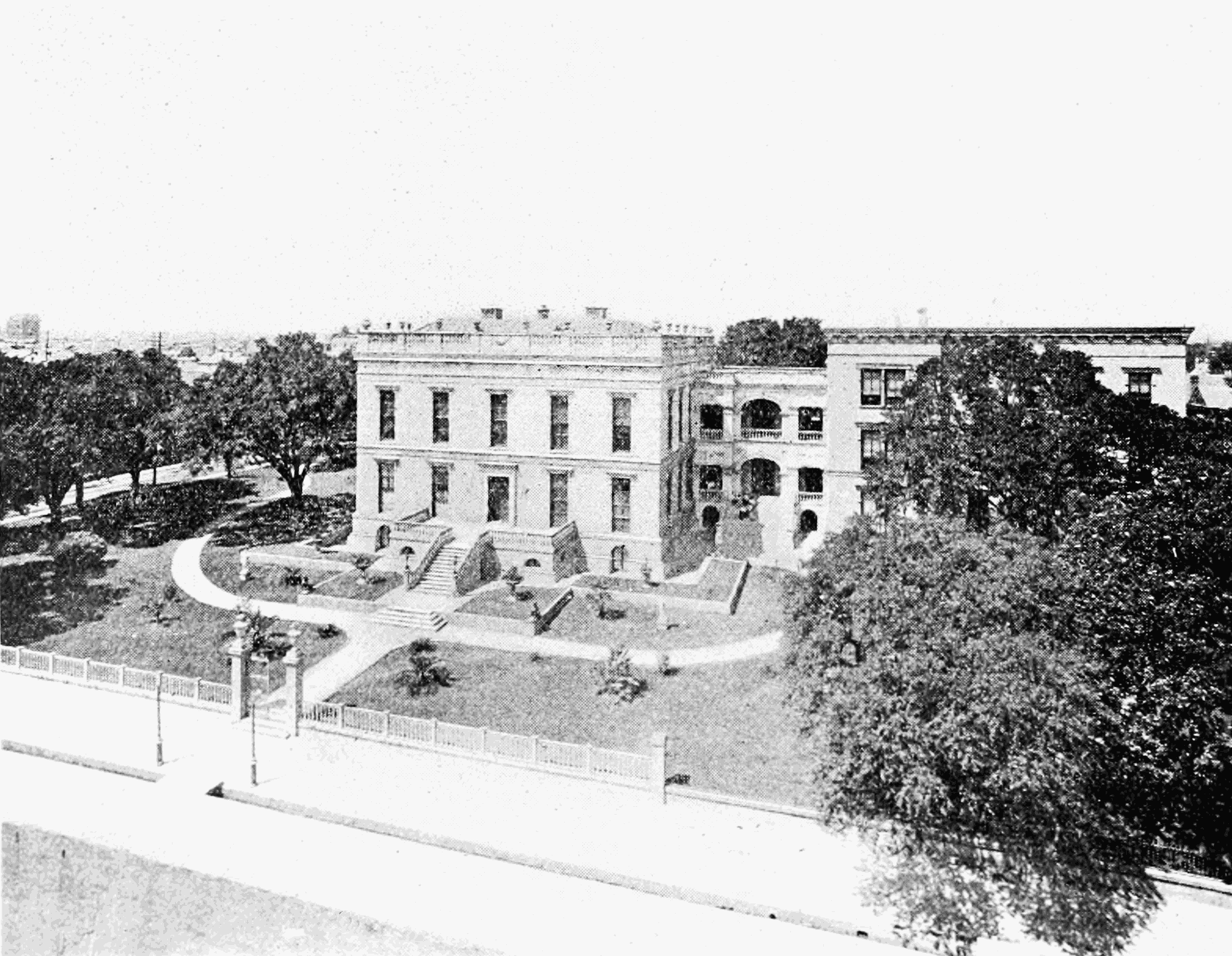
1905–1906

Josephine Louise Newcomb (born Josephine Louise Le Monnier, 1816–1901) established the college as a memorial to her daughter Sophie, who died in 1870 at the age of 15. Following an initial donation of $100,000, she made gifts totaling $3 million. She wanted to support a liberal academic education for young white women. Newcomb was influenced by Ida Richardson and the college was associated with the Progressive Movement from its earliest years.

Until its move in 1918 to its Broadway campus, Newcomb College was made up mostly of day students. Its move to its current site on the uptown campus of Tulane was also the occasion of development of dormitories and more campus life. Students at Newcomb College became increasingly sophisticated and the school's reputation grew.

The university had recruited Brandt V. B. Dixon as the first president of Newcomb College. To ensure girls and young women were academically prepared for college, Dixon established the Newcomb High School, which operated from 1888 to 1920. The preparatory school ensured that girls were ready to study at the college level, as some parents tried to send girls to Newcomb who were as young as 13 or 14, with little academic preparation. Dixon worked with faculty and students to continue to raise academic standards. By 1916, Newcomb had achieved a strong regional reputation and become "one of seven Southern schools which held a standard college designation within the Southern Association of College Women."

== Art at Newcomb ==
Out of its art school, the college created the business of what became the renowned Newcomb Pottery. This reflected both a progressive interest in craft and parents' desire for their daughters to learn a practical, "industrial" skill in the economically difficult postwar years. It was first headed by Mary Given Sheerer, previously associated with the Rookwood Pottery in Cincinnati. While the pottery did not employ that many women, some did find work there. Angela Gregory was artist-in-residence at Newcomb College. It produced more than 70,000 pieces before the pottery program closed in 1939. During these years, the college's art program expanded to include other arts and crafts, such as illustrated bookplates, jewelry, embroidery, and hand-bound books, the latter often given embossed leather covers and elaborate clasps.

In 2016, Women, Art, and Social Change: The Newcomb Pottery Enterprise, sponsored by the Smithsonian Institution Travelling Exhibition Service and the Newcomb Art Museum was shown at the Princeton University Art Museum, ending its tour at the Frist Center for the Visual Arts in Nashville.

Newcomb college founder Josephine Louise Newcomb and her family commissioned windows designed by Louis Comfort Tiffany for a chapel at the original site of Newcomb College. One of the commissions was for Resurrection, part of a triptych designed in memory of her daughter, Harriet Sophie Newcomb, for whom the college was named. Other Tiffany windows were designed for an area behind the altar of the original chapel in memory of Josephine's husband Warren Newcomb and her mother Mary Sophie LeMonnier.

Noted New York Times art critic, author, and art historian John Canaday taught at Newcomb from 1934 to 1936 and later headed the art department from 1950 to 1952.

Interest in the Newcomb Art Department and the college's collections of art gave rise to support for the Newcomb Art Museum and sustained support and restoration of its collections during post-Katrina administrative adjustments. In July 2015 the Newcomb Art Museum officially became the Newcomb Art Museum of Tulane University.

== Newcomb sports ==
Newcomb contributed greatly to the early development of basketball and other sports for women, which added to its reputation. The college was one of the first women's colleges to compete in national basketball games, along with northern women's colleges such as Smith, Mount Holyoke, and Vassar.

In 1895, Newcomb's physical education instructor Clara Gregory Baer published the handbook Basketball Rules for Women and Girls. The book described both the one-handed shot and the jump shot, which would not be adopted by men's basketball until 1936. The college had the first women's team to wear bloomers, a better solution for sports. On March 13, 1895, Newcomb students played the first public basketball game in the South before 560 other women at the Southern Athletic Club.

Newcomb ball, a game played as an alternative to volleyball, originated at Newcomb College and bears its name. The sport was very popular in the 1920s. The game is still played in various forms across the world.

== Social changes ==
As it grew, the college reflected many social changes, such as the wider roles of women during and after World War II. Married women were included in admissions. The college began to offer more coeducational classes with Tulane University. After the U.S. Supreme Court ruling in Brown v. Board of Education (1954), in the early 1960s both the university and college integrated to adjust to a new moral imperative. The focus of the curriculum changed over the years, and women were offered more science and business classes. Women from Newcomb participated in a jazz funeral for the Equal Rights Amendment when the amendment failed to pass by the 1982 congressional deadline.

== Restructuring ==
In December 2005 the Tulane University board of directors announced that the university would be reorganized on July 1, 2006, to accommodate needed changes due to losses following Hurricane Katrina. The board also approved the recommendation of a special Tulane Renewal task force to name a new, co-educational, single undergraduate college Newcomb-Tulane College.

This followed years of talk about restructuring. Some of the faculty had believed that Newcomb's separate status had adversely affected promotions, for instance, as well as other academic opportunities and had long encouraged a realignment within Tulane University. Since social changes of the 1970s, college and university discussions had centered on a different arrangement within the university.

=== Lawsuits ===
Arguing the "renewal" plan violated the donor's original intention of the gift, Newcomb's heirs filed and lost two suits against the university to invoke the restrictions of Newcomb's lifetime gifts and bequest in her will. The university stated that by naming Tulane her universal legatee in her will, Josephine Louise Newcomb placed no conditions on the use of her donations, but entrusted her gifts to the discretion of the Administrators of Tulane University.

After working its way through the Louisiana courts, the initial case filed in May 2006, Howard v. Tulane, was heard by the Louisiana Supreme Court. The court ruled on July 1, 2008, that the "successors" of a testator have standing to enforce the terms of a predecessor's will, though it did not rule specifically on the merits of the interpretation of Mrs. Newcomb's will. Instead the court returned the case to the trial court to require the plaintiffs to prove they are heirs. The plaintiffs dismissed their case.

Based on the Supreme Court's definition of "successor", a subsequent action, Montgomery v. Tulane, was filed in 2008 by Susan Henderson Montgomery, another great niece of Mrs. Newcomb and the plaintiff claiming to be a successor. After losing in New Orleans civil district court, the plaintiff filed an appeal to the state. On October 13, 2010, a state appeals court sided 3–2 with Tulane University. On February 18, 2011, the Louisiana Supreme Court voted, 4 to 2, with one abstention, to let a lower court's ruling in favor of Tulane stand. The plaintiffs in the case said that the lack of federal issues meant that the case would not be appealed to the U.S. Supreme Court and that the lawsuits were over.

=== H. Sophie Newcomb Memorial College Institute ===
H. Sophie Newcomb Memorial College Institute (colloquially called Newcomb Institute) is an umbrella organization that runs programs that were formerly operated by the H. Sophie Newcomb Memorial College. In its first year (2006–07), under the leadership of founding Interim Executive Director Rebecca Mark (Tulane Department of English), the non-academic Newcomb College Institute hosted 104 speakers and 110 different programs for women, men and guests at Tulane.

In May 2007, NCI inaugurated "Under the Oaks," a Commencement awards ceremony recognizing the accomplishments of Tulane University students involved in Newcomb Institute programs. It mimicked some of the Newcomb College traditions, such as the Daisy Chain, in which rising female seniors dress in white and carry a rope of greenery and fresh-cut daisies.

Molly Travis of the Tulane Department of English was appointed as the second Interim Executive Director at NCI, serving 2008–2009. Sally Kenney (formerly of the Humphrey Institute of Public Affairs at the University of Minnesota) was named the official first permanent executive director of the Newcomb College Institute in June 2009, and arrived on campus January 2010. Anita Raj, PhD, MS (formerly of the University of California San Diego and founding director of the Center on Gender, Equity, and Health there) became the Executive Director of the Newcomb Institute in July of 2023.

== Student body ==
Historically many Jewish girls from the Southern United States attended Newcomb. For one decade over one third of the girls in the school were Jewish. The school had the nickname, "Jewcomb," a nickname described by Eli S. Evans, author of The Provincials: A Personal History of Jews in the South, as not elegant. Historically most graduates of the Louise S. McGehee School in New Orleans attended Newcomb. Evans wrote that was because "Mardi Gras heavily intrudes itself in college life" at Newcomb and because the area's debutante season lasts from November to March.

== School culture ==
Gentile and Jewish girls at Newcomb historically had separate social spheres. This was a continuation of the social separation that occurred on the secondary school level in New Orleans. The alumnae of gentile sororities screened prospective applicants and recommended them to the girls in the current gentile sororities. Historically, each period two rushes were held at the school; one for gentile sororities and one for Jewish sororities. This did not occur in the 1980s. A girl entering Newcomb would receive a letter in the mail over the summer and return a photograph of herself and a preference on whether she would participate in the gentile rush or the Jewish rush. These rush practices no longer existed by the 1980s. Jewish sororities used the Hillel foundation to get lists of names of Jewish first year students.

Several years before 1997 the school stopped the two rush system. There was no two rush system in place at Newcomb College by the 1980s.

== See also ==
- Newcomb Art Gallery
- Newcomb-Tulane College
- Timeline of women's colleges in the United States
- Women's colleges in the Southern United States
- Newcomb Archives and Vorhoff Library
