= Effect of Hurricane Katrina on Tulane University =

As a result of Hurricane Katrina and its effects on New Orleans, Tulane University was closed for the second time in its history—the first being during the American Civil War. The university closed for four months during Katrina, as compared to four years during the Civil War.

The School of Public Health and Tropical Medicine's distance learning programs and courses stayed active, despite the storm displacing about 100,000 students. Many degree programs were cut, most notably in the engineering field.

Prior to Katrina, Tulane University was the largest private employer in the city of New Orleans; immediately afterward it became the city's single largest employer of any type, public or private.

Also as a result of Katrina's impact, the football team was forced to play its entire season on the road due to Katrina's extensive damage to the Superdome. The university reopened on January 17, 2006.

== Evacuation ==
Tulane began to publicly respond to the arrival of Hurricane Katrina on August 27, 2005, with an initial plan to close the university until September 1. The following day, that date was extended to "no earlier than" September 7. University officials led a rare evacuation of nearly 400 students (one report said that the number was closer to 700) to Jackson State University, all of whom remained safe after the hurricane's passage and returned to their homes if they were from outside the Gulf Coast region. This was the second time Tulane's evacuation plan had been used, the first being in September 2004 during Hurricane Ivan. In other hurricanes such as Georges in 1998, Tulane simply used its larger dorms as shelters for students.

During the storm, Tulane University Hospital & Clinic lost power and received patients from neighboring hospitals, the Louisiana Superdome, and the New Orleans Morial Convention Center. These patients, along with all hospital staff, staff family members present, and patients were evacuated within five days via helicopters from the top floor of a neighboring parking garage. This rescue effort was organized, directed, and paid for by the hospital's parent company, HCA. On February 14, 2006 it was the first hospital to reopen in downtown New Orleans after the hurricane.

== Damage ==
On August 30, the university reported that "physical damage to the area, including Tulane's campuses, was extensive" and conditions in the city were continuing to deteriorate. Power was out, water levels were rising, all city roads were blocked, and most of the Tulane workforce had evacuated. (Ultimately, the damage was less than what was at first suspected. The water levels stopped at sea level, resulting in standing water ranging from several inches to several feet on the half of the campus sitting north of Freret Street, but no flooding on the other half, which contains the historic academic quad and buildings that extend to Gibson Hall on St. Charles Avenue.) By September 1, only a core group of public safety and facilities personnel remained on campus. Tulane president Scott Cowen and an "emergency team" relocated to Houston, Texas to coordinate planning for recovery. Tulane reported that security was being maintained on campus and that students' belongings were safe in the unflooded areas of the dormitories. On September 2, President Cowen announced that the University would cancel classes for the fall semester. The storm caused about $650 million in damages.

=== Damage to Medical Center ===
After the levees broke as a result of Katrina on August 29, 2005, floodwaters started rising in the Tulane University Medical Center later that night. The water reached the first floor and swamped generators that had been in use after the power went out. The hospital decided to evacuate its 200 patients and 1,000 staff members after the building lost air conditioning and water. Helicopters took evacuees from the roof to other hospitals in Louisiana and Texas.

=== Damage to Howard-Tilton Memorial Library ===
After Hurricane Katrina struck New Orleans on August 29, 2005, the 40,000 square foot basement of the Howard-Tilton Memorial Library was flooded with more than eight feet of water. Four feet of water filled the basement of the library annex in Jones Hall. These areas housed the library's special collections, the Maxwell Music Library, and a very large collection of government documents. Due to serious flooding and damage to nearby neighborhoods, the library was inaccessible to reconnaissance teams for several days. In that time, the standing water in the basement, combined with the lack of electricity (and, thus, lack of temperature control and air circulation), lead to high humidity and temperature and the development of mold in the library at large. The disaster management company BELFOR was called to the scene within a few days to begin recovery work. A temporary air circulation system run by generators was installed just 10 days after the storm and within a month, all of the water had been pumped out of the basement of each building.

The damage from the flooding was significant. The walls and floors were coated in slime and muck. Furniture and shelving had floated to different locations, dislodging the materials that they once had housed, and subjecting them to submersion. The Maxwell Music Library had held more than 43,000 titles including books, scores, journals, and many rare and historic sound recordings on CD and LP. The salvage operation was mainly concentrated on printed materials, which had less chance of replacement and a better chance of restoration. More than 70 percent of the printed books and scores were salvaged for restoration, but no recordings could be saved. The Government Documents Archive, which had held over 500,000 volumes, lost 90% of its collection. Nearly all of the salvaged government documents were trapped in storage units containers that had to be ripped apart to access the saturated material inside.

A very large Microforms area on the north side of the basement had held more than 30,000 titles of collections of rare or scholarly material and newspaper archives. Less than five percent of these materials were salvaged because of the damage that lengthy immersion in dirty water can do to microforms, especially in formats such as fiche or microcard. None of the materials from the original 19th century Howard Collection could be salvaged, due to structural wreckage and especially dangerous conditions in that area of the library. Despite the significant obstacles to success, more than 300,000 important print volumes, 18,000 reels of microfilm, and 629,711 archival items affected by the storm were salvaged and restored through an elaborate process.

The upper floors in both library buildings and the collections on them were saved from mold, although each structure, especially the main building, sustained lasting damages.

== Diaspora ==
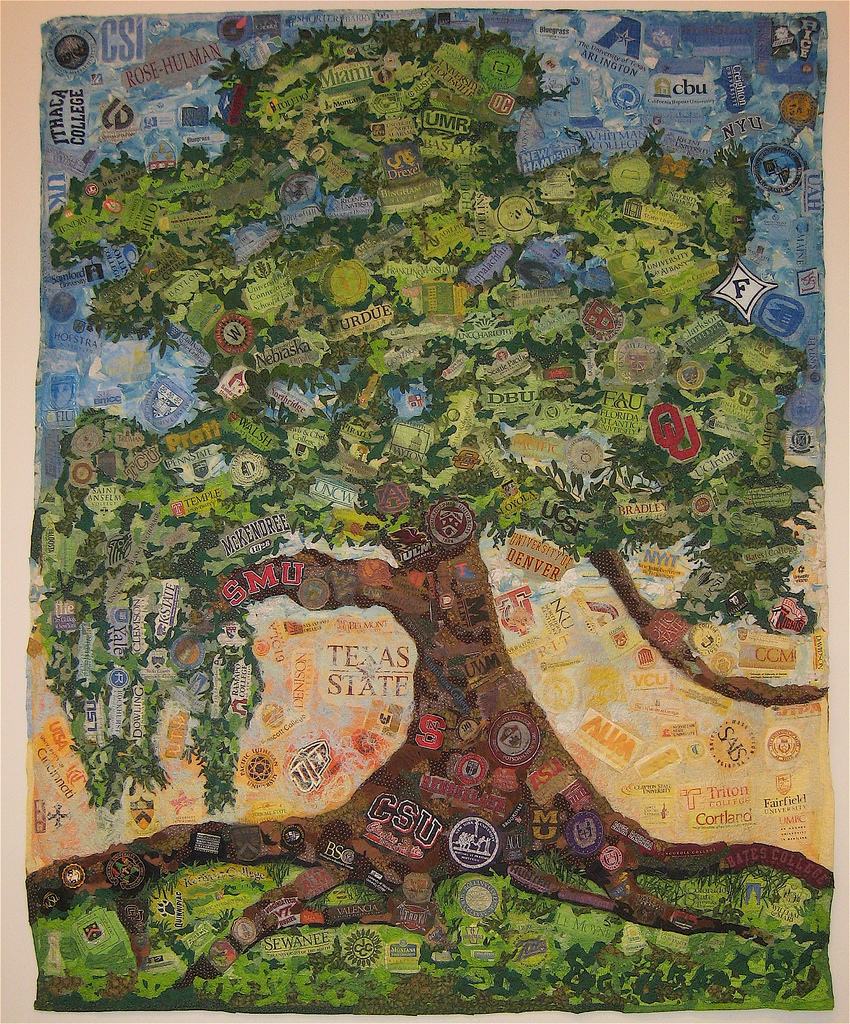
In the faculty dining room at Tulane is this quilt representing all organizations that took in Tulane students in the aftermath of Katrina.

The American Council on Education and the Association of American Universities urged their member institutions to help displaced students from Tulane and the area's other universities. Hundreds of universities (492 in total) made provisions to allow Tulane students (and students from other affected colleges) to enroll as "provisional students" for the fall semester. When the university reopened in the Spring, Tulane transferred credits earned by students elsewhere. To further help students graduate on schedule, Tulane offered two academic semesters between January and June 2006. A regular spring term began January 17, with a seven-week "Lagniappe Semester" which ran from May 15 through the end of June.

Tulane School of Medicine relocated its students and essential teaching staff to Houston, Texas, and continued its fall semester at Baylor College of Medicine. This was aided in part by the support of Michael DeBakey, pioneering heart surgeon, graduate of Tulane School of Medicine and chancellor emeritus at Baylor College of Medicine. Students taking the basic science medical courses used the facilities at Baylor, while 3rd and 4th year students did clinical rotations in several of the nearby teaching hospitals located in Houston, Galveston, and Temple. Tulane attempted to keep the medical students together, and discouraged transfer, except in the most extenuating of circumstances. Students were able to request transfers, but many medical schools supported Tulane's attempts to retain their student body and thus their school, although some students were successful in their appeals to transfer. The School of Medicine's stay in Texas ('Tulane West' or 'Tulane at Baylor') ended, with the students and faculty returning to New Orleans in July 2006.

== 2005–06 Renewal Plan ==
Facing a budget shortfall, the Board of Administrators announced a "Renewal Plan" on December 8, 2005 to reduce its annual operating budget and create a "student-centric" campus. For the 2005–06 fiscal year, the administration estimated operating losses at $300 to $450 million. Tulane laid off about 2,000 part-time employees in September and October 2005, 243 non-teaching personnel in November 2005, 230 faculty members in December 2005, and another 200 employees in January 2006.

Under the Renewal Plan, Tulane eliminated six undergraduate and graduate programs in the Engineering School: mechanical engineering, civil engineering, electrical engineering, computer engineering, environmental engineering, and computer science, and also a bachelor's degree in exercise science. The university's reasoning states as follows:

In deciding which programs to retain, which to discontinue, and which to reorganize, the administration took into account, for example, such factors about the University’s academic programs as: past and projected ability to meet enrollment goals; revenue generation, including the extent of tuition discounting in the program, and whether tuition from students in the program may be replaced by enrolling additional students in other programs at little or no incremental cost; reputation and ranking in national surveys; quality and extent of competitive research funding per faculty member compared with other institutions; external support for the program, including restricted and unrestricted gifts; costs associated with operating, improving and expanding the program; program size compared to other programs around the country; and external reviews. Application of these considerations resulted in the decision to eliminate the Departments of Civil & Environmental Engineering, Electrical Engineering & Computer Science, and Mechanical Engineering.

— AAUP Katrina Report

The remaining two engineering departments, biomedical engineering and chemical engineering, were merged into the new School of Science and Engineering. On December 10, 2005, Engineering School Dean Nicholas Altiero sent an email to Tulane engineering students stating that he was unsatisfied with the proposal and opposed the move. The university cut twenty-seven of its forty-five doctoral programs and suspended eight NCAA Division I intercollegiate athletic programs.

As a result of the plan dismissing so many tenured faculty without what the American Association of University Professors considered "due cause", Tulane, along with Loyola University, Southern University, and University of New Orleans was censured by the AAUP. Tulane's responses purportedly showed that the AAUP's draft report was flawed significantly and contained numerous errors of fact, omission and interpretation. Tulane's administration responded that the final version of the AAUP report acknowledges some of the corrections the university offered, and continued to assert that errors and meritless conclusions remain in the final version. Tulane's censure was eventually lifted in November 2009, after the university adopted policies that were close to the organization's standards.

For spring 2006 the administration reported that "94 percent of all students" returned. By keeping the school smaller, officials said they will not have to lower admission standards.

The university Renewal Plan created a single undergraduate co-ed college, Newcomb-Tulane College, in July 2006, discontinuing Tulane's liberal arts and sciences coordinate college system that comprised Tulane College (for men) and the H. Sophie Newcomb Memorial College (for women). On March 16, 2006, the board announced the establishment of the H. Sophie Newcomb Memorial College Institute, an umbrella organization for extracurricular programs, to enhance women's education at the university.

Claiming that dissolution of Newcomb College violates conditions on the gifts and will of its founder Josephine Louise Newcomb, Mrs. Newcomb's heirs sued Tulane to enforce their ancestor's donor intent. The lower courts found for Tulane and the Louisiana Supreme Court refused to review the lower court decision.

Critics of the Renewal Plan charge the school administration of using Katrina as the excuse to push an agenda that would otherwise have been difficult to accomplish. In response to cutting several engineering degree programs, students, faculty, and alumni started the Save Tulane Engineering campaign to reinstate the five engineering majors and the separate school. The American Association of University Professors expressed concern at the lack of meaningful faculty involvement in crafting the Renewal Plan, as did many students.

On April 4, 2007, Tulane University announced that the School of Science and Engineering will introduce a new major beginning fall 2007, Engineering Physics. The major, the first new engineering major added since the School of Engineering closed in the wake of Hurricane Katrina, is designed to meet the criteria of the Engineering Accreditation Commission, and is geared towards preparing students in quantum physics and nanotechnology.

On May 8, 2007, Tulane announced that more than 1,375 high school seniors had committed to coming to Tulane University as part of the class of 2011. This increase in enrollment, surpassing 882 students from the class of 2010, and a planned 1,200 students for the class of 2011, marks a strong return in enrollment that nears the level prior to Hurricane Katrina. Tulane welcomed 1,500 new students including 128 transfer students in fall 2007.

== Effect on Athletics ==
As a result of the impact, the entire Tulane football team was forced to play all their games away from home due to the Hurricane's destruction of the Superdome. The team evacuated the university on August 28, and sheltered at Jackson State University in Mississippi along with the women's soccer team. Athletic Director Rick Dickson said there was a possibility that Tulane wouldn't play football for the 2005 season. However, on September 8, it was announced that they would be playing against Mississippi State Bulldogs at Independence Stadium in Shreveport, Louisiana on September 17. Their next game was played on October 1 at LSU's Tiger Stadium in Baton Rouge. Their game scheduled for October 8 was played at Cajun Field in Lafayette. A game against UTEP was played on October 14 at Tulane's temporary home in Ruston. Tulane's final game was hosted at Malone Stadium in Monroe versus University of Tulsa on November 19. The Green Wave eventually finished their season 2–9.

The football team were given shelter first in Dallas and then at Louisiana Tech University in Ruston, Louisiana, and arrived there on September 9 with a greeting from the marching band and the university's president, Dan Reneau.

Baseball and women's basketball were moved to Texas Tech University in Lubbock, Texas. Men's basketball, women's swimming & diving, men's and women's tennis, women's volleyball and women's soccer headed to Texas A&M University in College Station, Texas. The women's soccer team were the first ones to compete since the hurricane, which was a 2–1 loss to Louisville Cardinals on September 2 in Birmingham, Alabama.

The Athletics Facility, the James W. Wilson Center, suffered extensive damage. The first floor of the facility, which houses the football locker room, weight room, academic center and ticket office was filled with four feet of water.

On December 18, the women's basketball team played their first home game at Devlin Fieldhouse in New Orleans, with the men playing on December 27. The men's basketball team played 10 games in New Orleans and 4 at Reed Arena in College Station.
