= A Studio in the Woods =

Studio for art and environmentalism in New Orleans, Louisiana

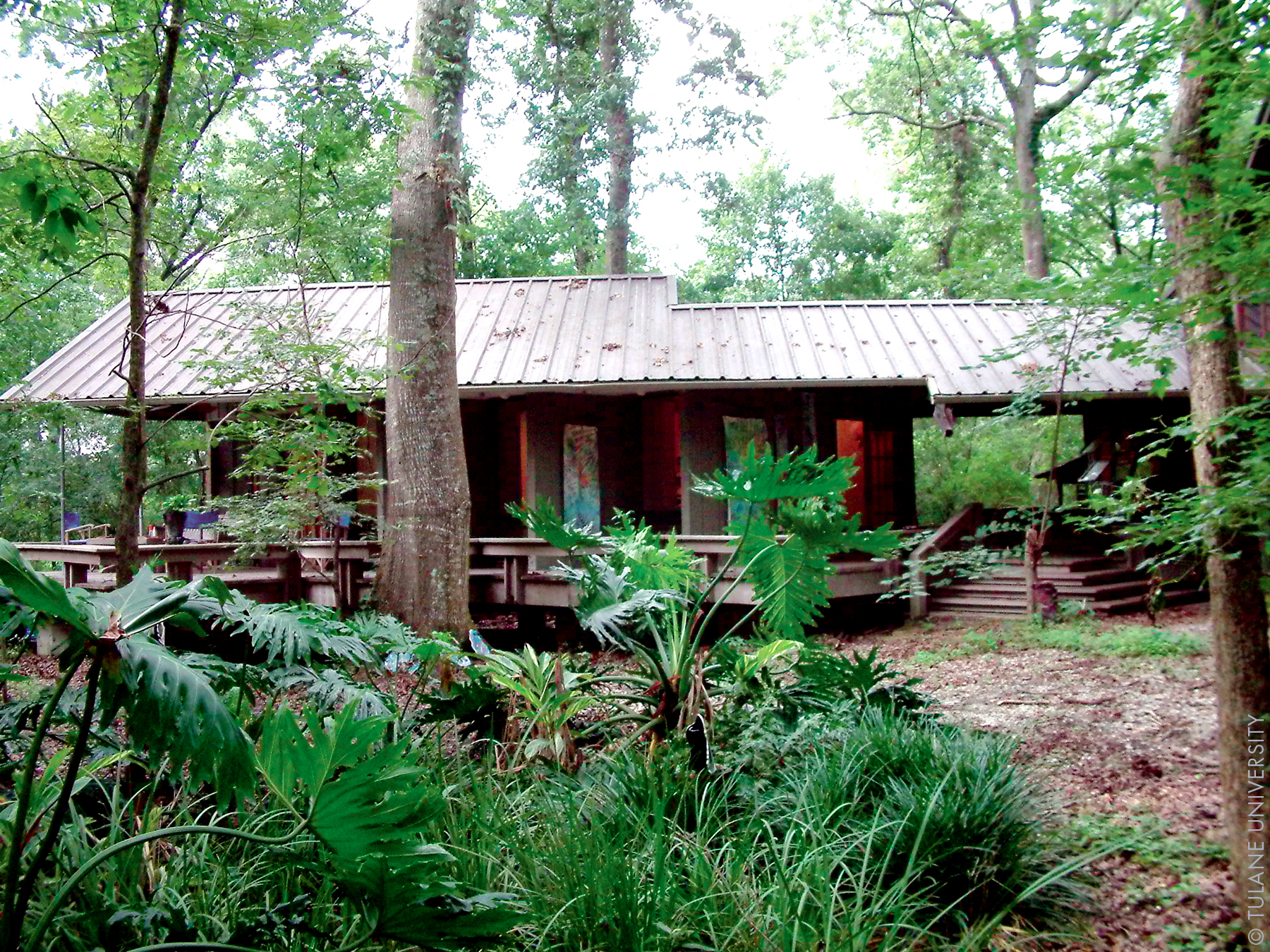
- Founder: Lucianne Carmichael; Joe Carmichael
- Purpose: Artistic retreat center Environmental preserve
- Headquarters: 13401 Patterson Road; New Orleans, Louisiana, United States
- Coordinates: 29.890324°N 89.911317°W
- Managing director: Ama Rogan
- Parent organization: Bywater Institute of Tulane University
- Website: astudiointhewoods.org

A Studio in the Woods is a residency for artists and scholars located in New Orleans, Louisiana, United States. It is a part of the Bywater Institute of Tulane University. Its location is a mostly rural section of the lower Algiers section of the New Orleans urban area, along the west bank of the Mississippi River, occupying 7.66 acres (3.10 ha).

A Studio in the Woods was founded as a haven for artists to focus on their own creativity. As the studio evolved, it became a collaboration of artists and environmentalists, with an emphasis on science-inspired art education. A Studio in the Woods serves as an environmental preserve, and a theme of the studio is for art to explore environmental issues. It is therefore an example of arts-based environmental education.

== Founding ==
New Orleans artists Lucianne Carmichael and Joe Carmichael purchased the property in 1969 with a house to serve as their home and as a studio for artists. The property they purchased is a rare example of bottomland hardwood forest within the city limits of New Orleans. They subsequently founded A Studio in the Woods in 2001.

Committed to environmental issues, the founders constructed the studio making use of reclaimed lumber and handcrafted tile floors, with furniture made of locally produced hardwoods. The studio originally served as a six-week incubator for painters, sculptors, writers, dancers, musicians, and others involved in the creative arts, with an emphasis on art as it relates to environmentalism.

Although it was initially an independent entity, the studio became a part of Tulane University in 2004 so as to help assure its existence into perpetuity.

Founder Joe Carmichael remained a member of the board of directors until the time of his death in 2023. Co-founder Lucianne Carmichael died in 2016.

== Programs ==
External media
- Media links for A Studio in the Woods

Images
- Photograph of Joe and Lucianne Carmichael at the Tulane University Digital Library

Audio
- Interview with Lucianne and Joe Carmichael, shortly after Hurricane Katrina, by NPR.

A premise of A Studio in the Woods is that south Louisiana is a microcosm of the global environment, both with respect to challenges and possibilities. It provides retreats and residencies to advance its objectives and to act as a catalysis for new ideas and public discourse. The studio's programs are often thematic, although they pertain to changes in both the arts and the environment, as well as the interplay between science and the arts.

A Studio in the Woods conducts several types of residency programs in which artists and other scholars reside at the studio for a period of time, typically for several weeks of lodging, studio time, and stipends. The studio at times issues special invitations to particular artists and scholars. Examples of these have included scholars from the artists' collective Fallen Fruit and writer Edward Ball. The studio also conducts children's camps.

A Studio in the Woods also hosts specific events. An annual Autumn event there is called "FORESTival" and includes music, art, and guided tours through the wooded grounds of the studio.

The studio maintains credentials from the Organization of Biological Field Stations, giving it accessibility to certain of the organization's research projects. A Studio in the Woods has on-going partnerships with the New Orleans Museum of Art and with New Orleans artist and biologist Brandon Ballengée. As of 2023, the studio maintains a press kit and issues a newsletter called "News from the Woods" which it sends in electronic form.
