= Tulane University School of Professional Advancement =

Tulane University campus in New Orleans and Elmwood, Louisiana, US

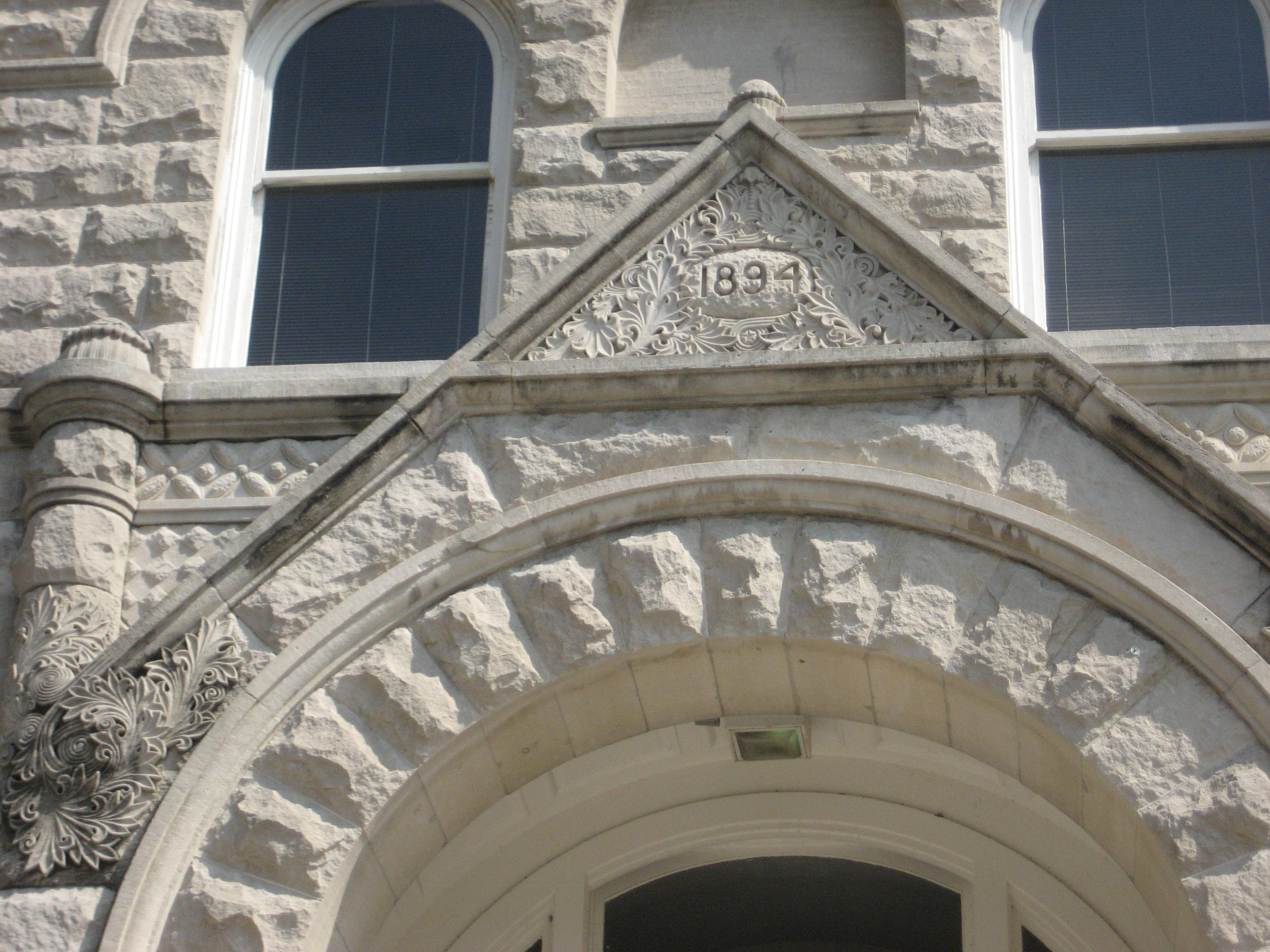
- Type: Private
- Established: 1890
- Dean: Dr. Suri Duitch
- Location: New Orleans, Louisiana, US
- Website: sopa.tulane.edu

The Tulane University School of Professional Advancement (SOPA) is a school at Tulane University that offers 9 undergraduate degree programs, 9 master’s degree programs, 16 graduate certificates, and 8 post-baccalaureate certificates, many of which can be completed online.

The School of Professional Advancement has two campuses. The two locations are in Greater New Orleans, including one at the Tulane University campus in the Uptown neighborhood of New Orleans and a location in Elmwood, Louisiana.

The first continuing education classes available through Tulane University were offered in 1884. In 2006, the school was renamed from University College to the School of Continuing Studies as part of a university-wide renewal plan in the aftermath of Hurricane Katrina. On March 17, 2017, the school was again relaunched as the School of Professional Advancement.

Dr. Suri Duitch serves as the dean of the school and vice president for academic innovation at Tulane University.

== See also ==
- Tulane University
