= Tulane University School of Social Work =

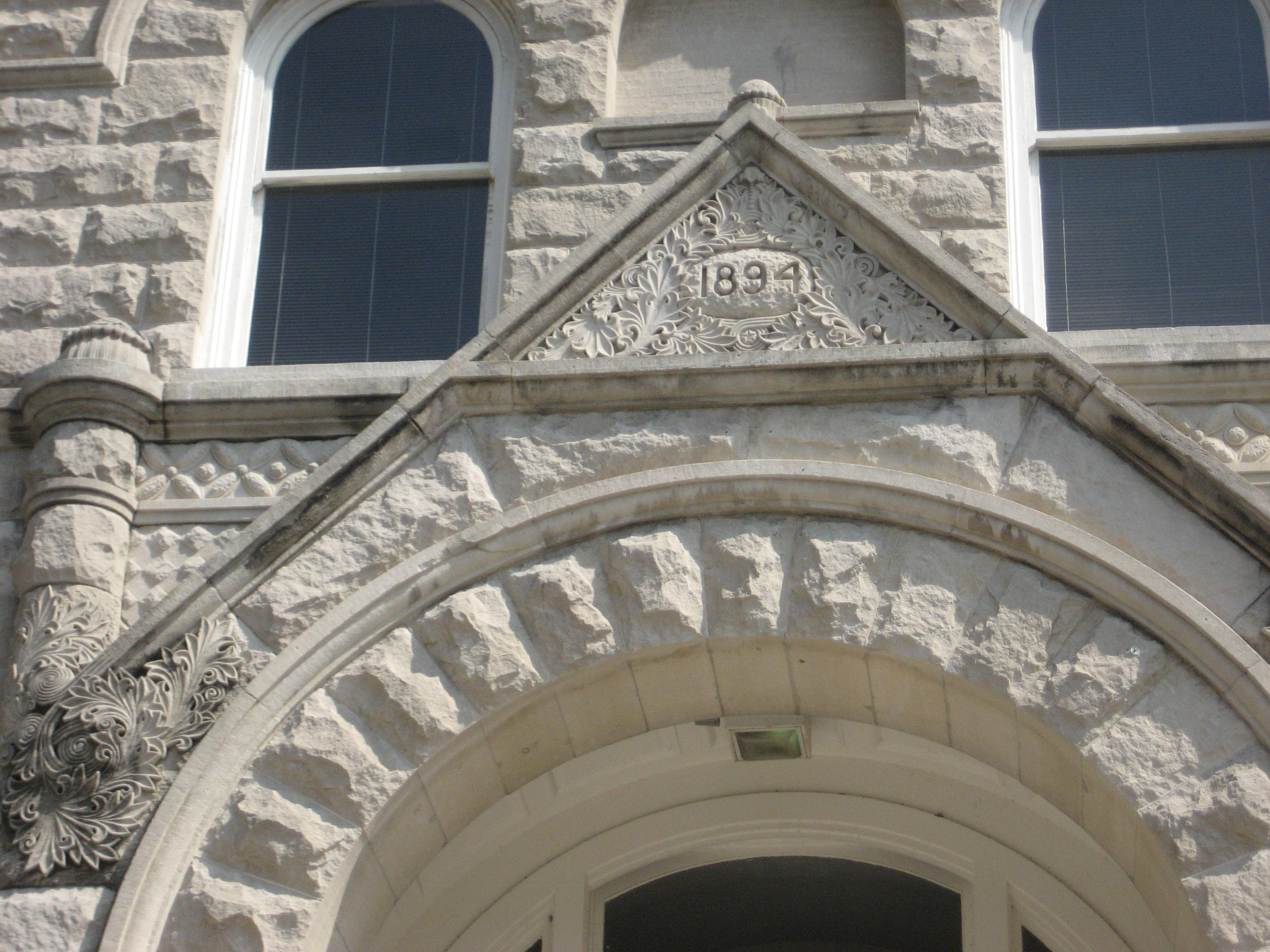
- Type: Private
- Established: 1914 (classes); 1921 (formal degree granting)
- Parent institution: Tulane University
- Dean: Susan Davies
- Location: New Orleans, Louisiana, United States; 29.9556°N 90.0745°W
- Campus: Urban
- Website: tssw.tulane.edu

Tulane University School of Social Work is the social work school of Tulane University. The school is located on Tulane's Downtown New Orleans campus at 127 Elk Place. TSSW is fully accredited by the Council on Social Work Education.

== History ==
Tulane University began offering classes in social welfare in 1914. Sponsored by grants from the American Red Cross, a formal one-year program was implemented in 1921.

By 1927, with funding from a Rockefeller grant, the school became a separate program with a two-year curriculum qualifying students for the Master of Arts.

The Disaster Resilience Leadership Academy was established in March 2009 through a grant from the Office of Foreign Disaster Assistance and was administered within the Tulane Payson Center. In 2013, DRLA was transferred to Tulane School of Social Work. DRLA welcomes its first online MS-DRL cohort in Fall 2025.

== Alumni ==
- Sidney Barthelemy - former Mayor of New Orleans
- Jerry Ortiz y Pino - former New Mexico Senator
- Joseph Bouie - former Louisiana State Senator
- Ranord Darensburg - New Orleans Juvenile Court judge
- Rebecca A. Chaisson - Dean of Southern University at New Orleans' School of Social Work
- Alaiya Williams - first transgender Black woman to earn a Doctorate of Social Work in Louisiana

== See also ==
- Tulane University
- List of social work schools
