= Gibson Hall (Tulane University) =

Building in New Orleans, Louisiana, U.S.

Coordinates: 29°56′7.5″N 90°7′22″W

Gibson Hall is a building at Tulane University in New Orleans, Louisiana, United States. It sits across from Audubon Park.

== History ==
Constructed in 1894, Gibson Hall is the oldest structure on the present Tulane University campus. It faces on to St. Charles Avenue and is the entry landmark to the uptown campus. It was designed by architects Harrod and Andry in the Richardsonian Romanesque style and constructed of stone over brick.

It was named for Randall Lee Gibson, an alumnus, Confederate General, U.S. Senator from Louisiana, and the first President of the University Board of Administrators. The building houses most of the senior level administration as well as the Office of Undergraduate Admission and the School of Professional Advancement.

== Gallery ==
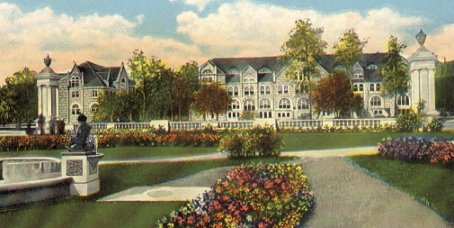

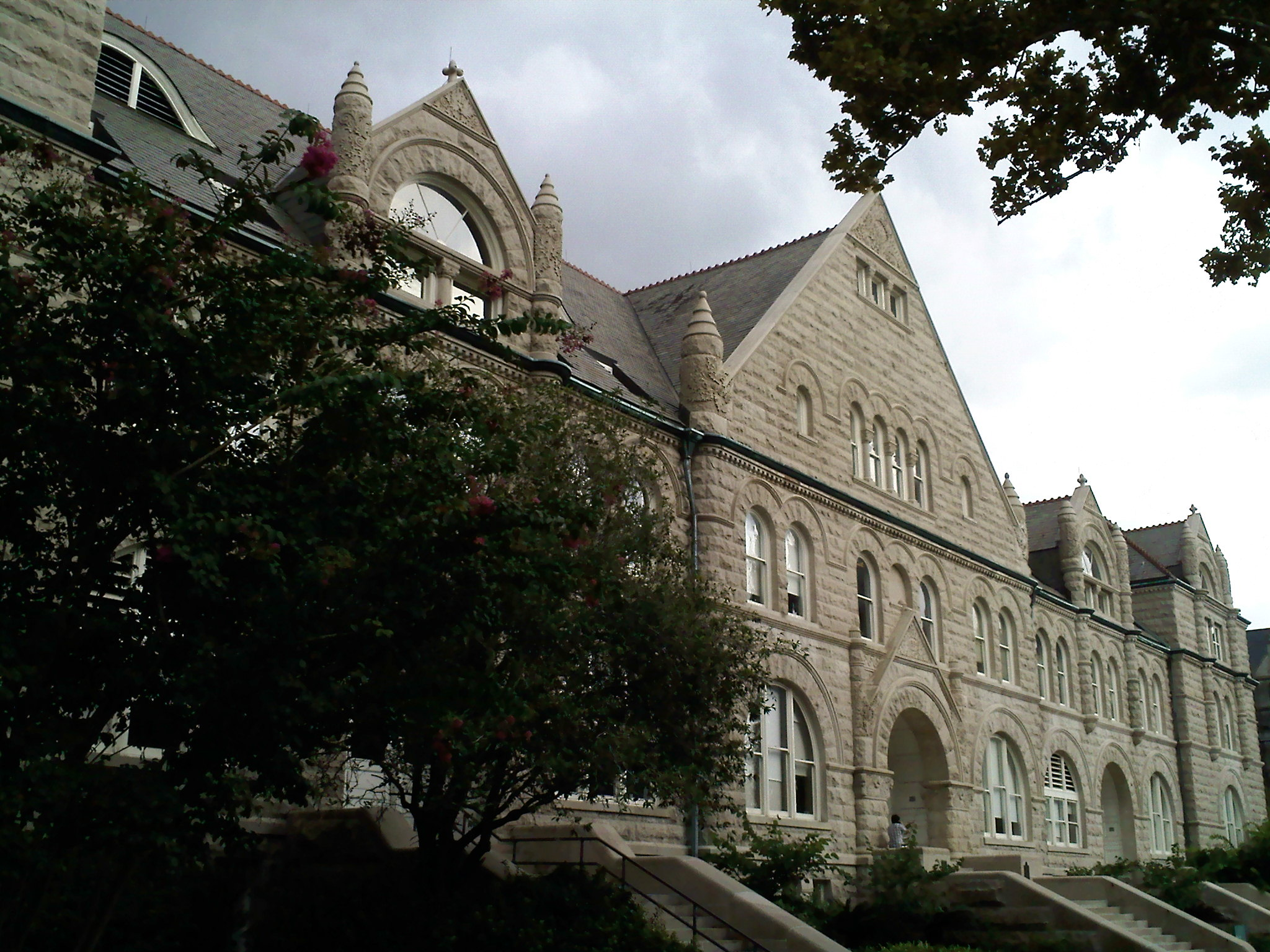

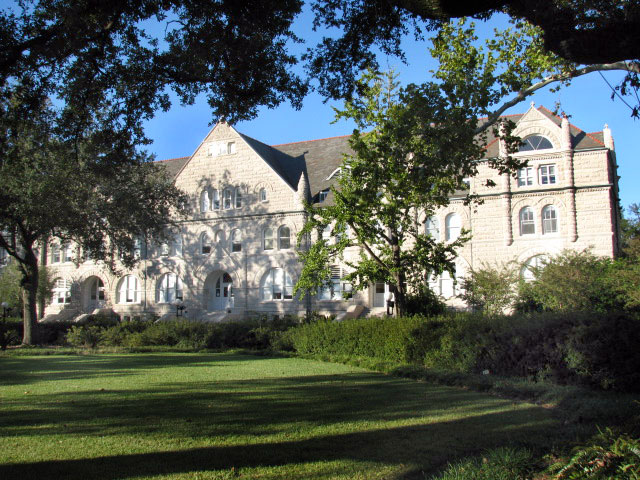
