= Tulane University =

Private university in New Orleans, Louisiana, US

Tulane University of Louisiana
- Former names: Medical College of Louisiana (1834–1847); University of Louisiana (1847–1884)
- Motto: Non Sibi Sed Suis (Latin)
- Motto in English: "Not for oneself, but for one's own"
- Type: Private research university
- Established: 1834; 192 years ago
- Accreditation: SACS
- Academic affiliations: AAU; NAICU; ORAU; URA; Space-grant
- Endowment: $2.47 billion (2025)
- President: Michael Fitts
- Faculty: approx. 1,200
- Administrative staff: approx. 2,900
- Students: 14,027 (Fall 2022)
- Undergraduates: 8,610
- Postgraduates: 5,452
- Location: New Orleans, Louisiana, United States; 29.94°N 90.12°W
- Campus: 110 acres (0.45 km^{2}); Large city
- Other campuses: Covington; Harahan
- Newspaper: Tulane Hullabaloo
- Colors: Green and blue
- Nickname: Green Wave
- Sporting affiliations: NCAA Division I FBS - The American; CUSA
- Mascot: Riptide the Pelican
- Website: tulane.edu

The Tulane University of Louisiana (commonly referred to as Tulane University) is a private research university in New Orleans, Louisiana, United States. Founded as the Medical College of Louisiana in 1834 by a cohort of medical doctors, it became a comprehensive public university as the University of Louisiana in 1847. The institution became private under the endowments of Paul Tulane and Josephine Louise Newcomb in 1884 and 1887. The Tulane University School of Law and the Tulane University School of Medicine are, respectively, the 12th oldest law school and 15th oldest medical school in the United States.

Tulane has been a member of the Association of American Universities since 1958 and is classified among "R1: Doctoral Universities – Very high research activity". Alumni include 12 governors of Louisiana; 1 Chief Justice of the United States; members of the United States Congress, including a Speaker of the House; 2 Surgeons General of the United States; 23 Marshall Scholars; 18 Rhodes Scholars; 15 Truman Scholars; 155 Fulbright Scholars; 4 living billionaires; and a former President of Costa Rica. Two Nobel laureates have been affiliated with the university.

== History ==
=== Founding and early history – 19th century ===
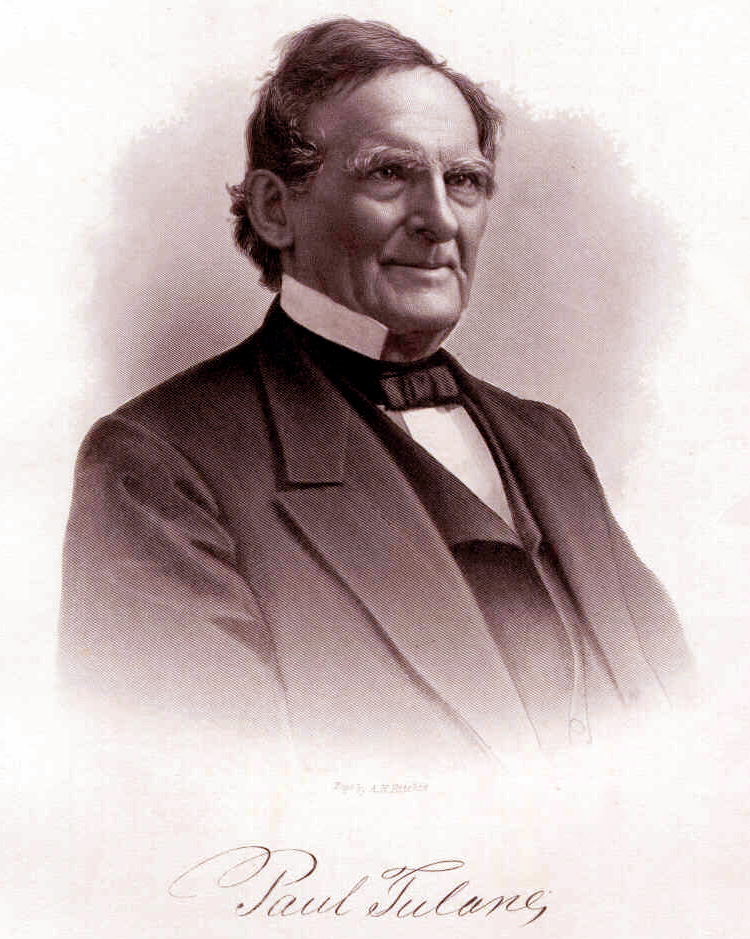
Paul Tulane, eponymous philanthropist of the school

The university was founded as the Medical College of Louisiana in 1834 partly as a response to the fears of smallpox, yellow fever, and cholera in the United States. The university became the second medical school in the South, and the 15th in the United States at the time. In 1847, the state legislature established the school as the University of Louisiana, a public university, and the law department was added to the university. Subsequently, in 1851, the university established its first academic department. The first president chosen for the new university was Francis Lister Hawks, an Episcopal priest and prominent citizen of New Orleans at the time.

The university was closed from 1861 to 1865 during the American Civil War. After reopening, it went through a period of financial challenges because of an extended agricultural depression in the South which affected the nation's economy. Paul Tulane, owner of a prospering dry goods and clothing business, donated extensive real estate within New Orleans for the support of education. This donation led to the establishment of a Tulane Educational Fund (TEF), whose board of administrators sought to support the University of Louisiana instead of establishing a new university. In response, through the influence of former Confederate general Randall Lee Gibson, the Louisiana state legislature transferred control of the University of Louisiana to the administrators of the TEF in 1884. This act created the Tulane University of Louisiana. The university was privatized, and is one of only a few American universities to be converted from a state public institution to a private one.

Paul Tulane's endowment to the school specified that the institution could only admit white students, and Louisiana law passed in 1884 reiterated this condition.

In 1884, William Preston Johnston became the first president of Tulane. He had succeeded Robert E. Lee as president of Washington and Lee University after Lee's death. He had moved to Louisiana and become president of Louisiana State University in 1880.

In 1885, the university established its graduate division, later becoming the Graduate School. One year later, gifts from Josephine Louise Newcomb totaling over $3.6 million, led to the establishment of the H. Sophie Newcomb Memorial College within Tulane University. Newcomb was the first coordinate college for women in the United States and became a model for such institutions as Pembroke College and Barnard College. In 1894 the College of Technology formed, which would later become the School of Engineering. In the same year, the university moved to its present-day uptown campus on historic St. Charles Avenue, five miles (8 km) by streetcar from downtown New Orleans.

=== 20th century ===
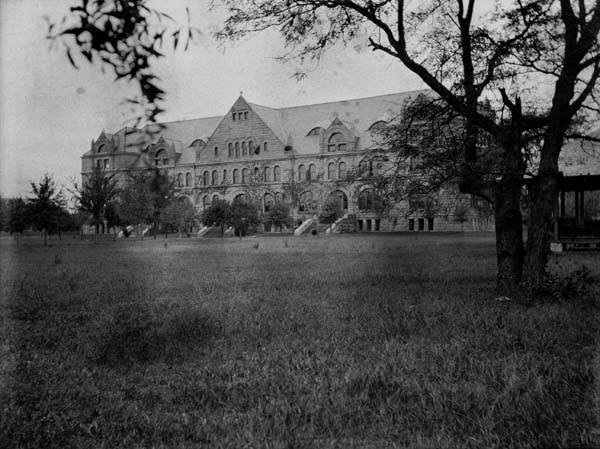
Gibson Hall, located on the uptown campus of Tulane University in 1904

With the improvements to Tulane University in the late 19th century, Tulane had a firm foundation to build upon as the premier university of the Deep South and continued the legacy with growth in the 20th century. During 1907, the school established a four-year professional curriculum in architecture through the College of Technology, growing eventually into the Tulane School of Architecture. One year later, Schools of Dentistry and Pharmacy were established, albeit temporarily. The School of Dentistry ended in 1928, and Pharmacy six years later. In 1914, Tulane established a College of Commerce, the first business school in the South. In 1925, Tulane established the independent Graduate School. Two years later, the university set up a School of Social Work, also the first in the southern United States. Tulane was instrumental in promoting the arts in New Orleans and the South in establishing the Newcomb School of Art with William Woodward as director, thus establishing the renowned Newcomb Pottery. The Middle American Research Institute was established in 1925 at Tulane "for the purpose of advanced research into the history (both Indian and colonial), archaeology, tropical botany (both economic and medical), the natural resources and products, of the countries facing New Orleans across the waters to the south; to gather, index and disseminate data thereupon; and to aid in the upbuilding of the best commercial and friendly relations between these Trans-Caribbean peoples and the United States."

University College was established in 1942 as Tulane's division of continuing education. By 1950, the School of Architecture had grown out of Engineering into an independent school. In 1958, the university was elected to the Association of American Universities, an organization consisting of 62 of the leading research universities in North America. The School of Public Health and Tropical Medicine again became independent from the School of Medicine in 1967. It was established in 1912. Tulane's School of Tropical Medicine also remains the only one of its kind in the country. On April 23, 1975, US President Gerald Ford spoke at Tulane University's Fogelman Arena at the invitation of F. Edward Hebert, the US representative of Louisiana's 1st Congressional District. During the historic speech, Ford announced that the Vietnam War was "finished as far as America is concerned" one week before the fall of Saigon. Ford drew parallels to the Battle of New Orleans and said that such positive activity could do for America's morale what the battle did in 1815.

During World War II, Tulane was one of 131 colleges and universities nationally that took part in the V-12 Navy College Training Program which offered students a path to a Navy commission.

In 1963, Tulane enrolled its first African American students. In 1990, Rhonda Goode-Douglas, alongside other black, female students, founded the first African American sorority in Tulane's history, AKA Omicron Psi.

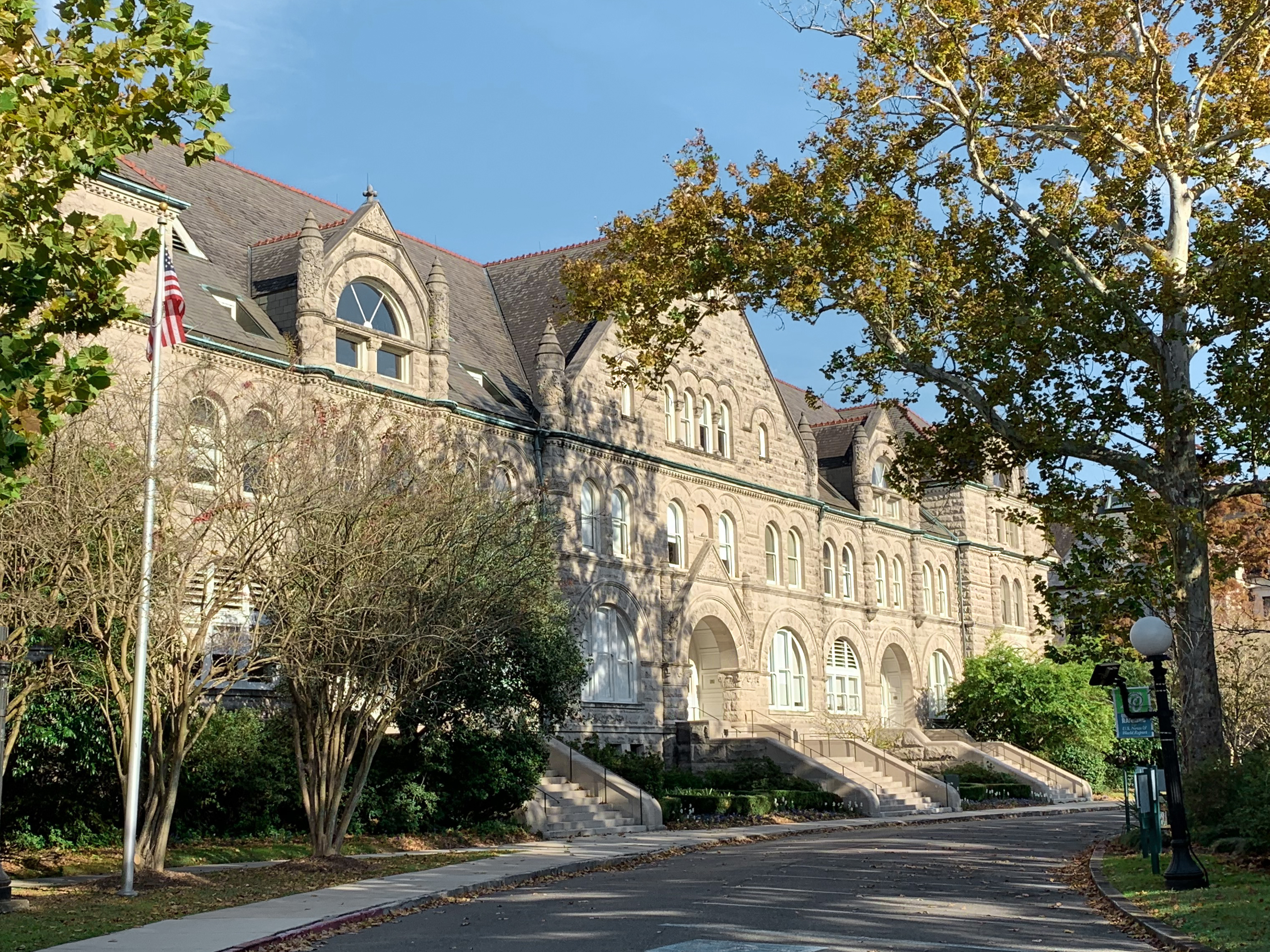
Gibson Hall today. Facing historic St. Charles Avenue, it is the entry landmark on the uptown campus.

A detailed account of the history of Tulane University from its founding through 1965 was published by Dyer.

=== 21st century ===
In July 2004, Tulane received two $30 million donations to its endowment, the largest individual or combined gifts in the university's history. The donations came from James H. Clark, a member of the university's board of trustees and founder of Netscape, and David Filo, a graduate of its School of Engineering and co-founder of Yahoo!. A fund-raising campaign called "Promise & Distinction" raised $730.6 million by October 3, 2008, increasing the university's total endowment to more than $1.1 billion; by March 2009, Yvette Jones, Tulane's Chief Operating Officer, told Tulane's Staff Advisory Council that the endowment "has lost close to 37%", affected by the Great Recession. In 2021, Tulane had to evacuate all students and close down for a month due to damage from Hurricane Ida. No classes took place for two weeks, then there were virtual classes for the remaining two weeks.

In June 2024, non-tenure track faculty at Tulane voted to form Tulane Workers United, the first higher education faculty union in the state of Louisiana. The union is formally affiliated with Workers United and SEIU. In 2025, an environmental researcher resigned in protest of what she called a "gag order" imposed on her by Tulane after complaints in the state legislature that her research was "anti-chemical."

==== Hurricane Katrina ====
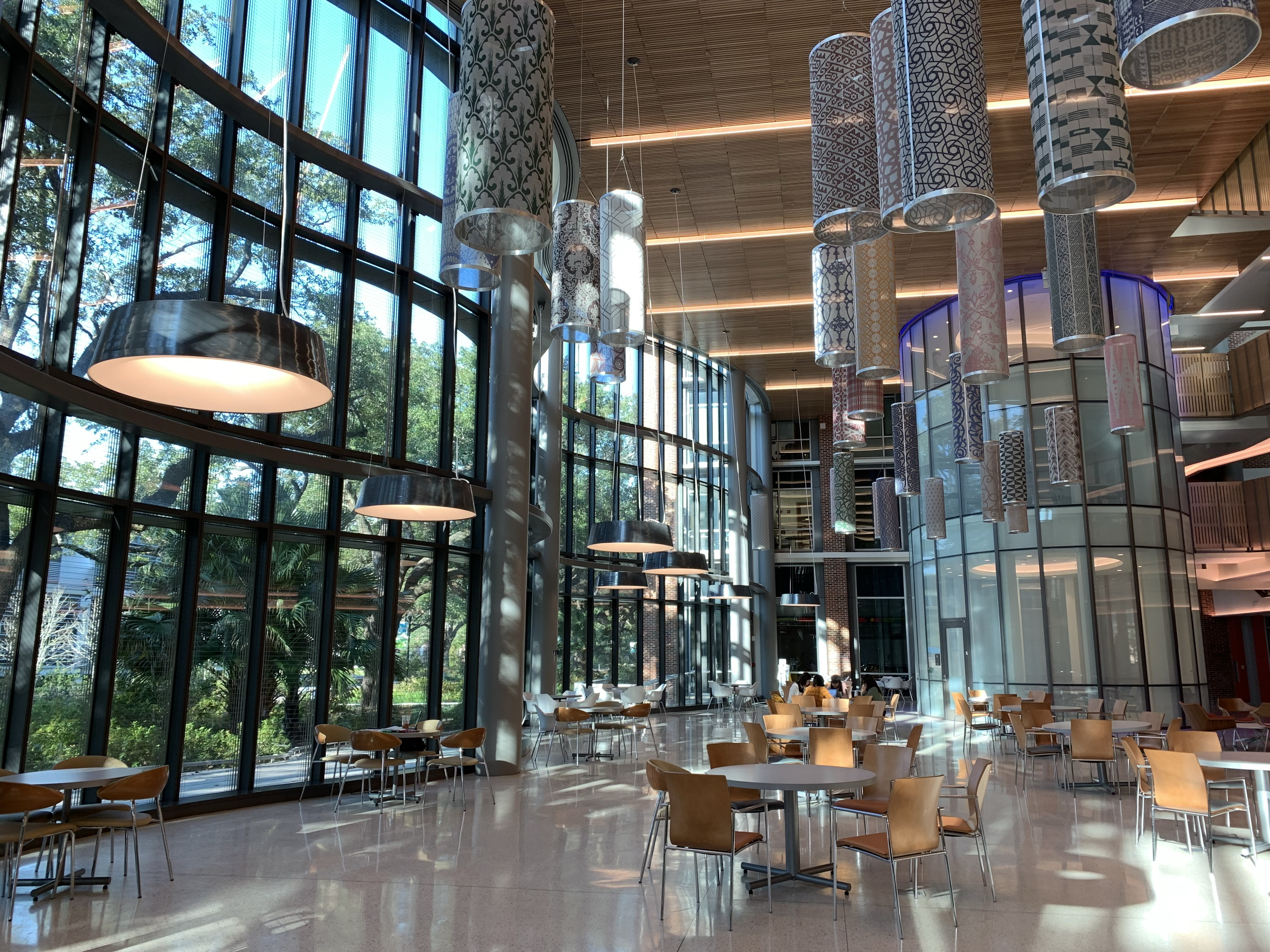
Main hall at the Freeman School of Business

As a result of Hurricane Katrina in August 2005 and its damaging effects on New Orleans, most of the university was closed for the second time in its history—the first being during the Civil War. The closing affected the first semester of the school calendar year. The School of Public Health and Tropical Medicine's distance learning programs and courses stayed active. The School of Medicine relocated to Houston, Texas for a year. Aside from student-athletes attending college classes together on the same campuses, most undergraduate and graduate students dispersed to campuses throughout the U.S. The storm inflicted more than $650 million in damages to the university, with some of the greatest losses impacting the Howard-Tilton Memorial Library and its collections.

Facing a budget shortfall, the Board of Administrators announced a "Renewal Plan" in December 2005 to reduce its annual operating budget and create a "student-centric" campus. Addressing the school's commitment to New Orleans, a course credit involving service learning became a requirement for an undergraduate degree. In 2006 Tulane became the first Carnegie ranked "high research activity" institution to have an undergraduate public service graduation requirement. In May 2006, graduation ceremonies included commencement speakers former Presidents George H. W. Bush and Bill Clinton, who commended the students for their desire to return to Tulane and serve New Orleans in its renewal.

== Campus ==
=== Uptown ===
- Tulane University
- U.S. National Register of Historic Places
- U.S. Historic district
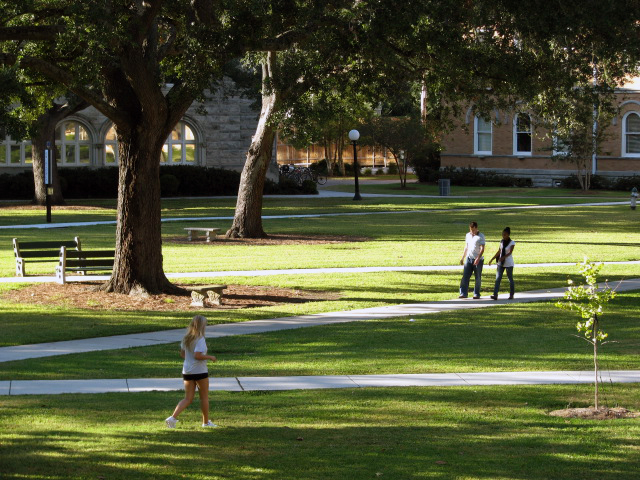
- Gibson Quadrangle

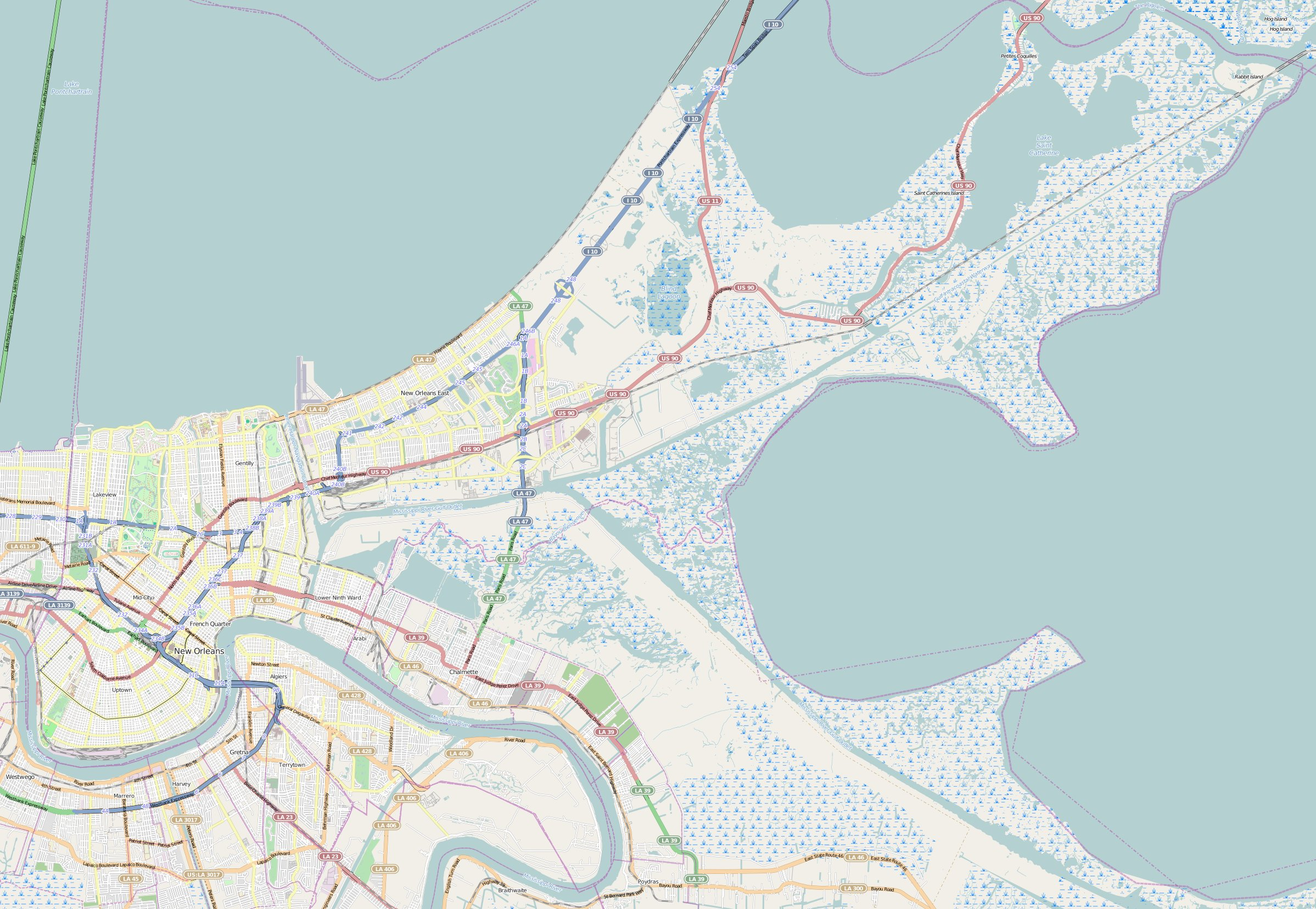
- Location within New Orleans Location within Louisiana Location within the United States
- Location: St. Charles Ave., S. Claiborne, Broadway, and Calhoun Sts., New Orleans, Louisiana
- Area: 45 acres (18.2 ha)
- Built: 1834
- Architectural style: Renaissance, Romanesque, Modern
- NRHP reference No.: 78001433
- Added to NRHP: March 24, 1978

Tulane's primary campus is located in Uptown New Orleans on St. Charles Avenue, directly opposite Audubon Park, and extends north to South Claiborne Avenue through Freret and Willow Street. The campus is known colloquially as the Uptown or St. Charles campus. It was established in the 1890s and occupies more than 110 acres (0.45 km^{2}) of land. The campus is known both for its large live oak trees as well as its architecturally historic buildings. It has been listed on the National Register of Historic Places since 1978. The campus architecture consists of several styles, including Richardsonian Romanesque, Elizabethan, Italian Renaissance, Mid-Century Modern, and contemporary styles. The front campus buildings use Indiana White Limestone or orange brick for exteriors, while the middle campus buildings are mostly adorned in red St. Joe brick, the staple of Newcomb College Campus buildings. Loyola University is directly adjacent to Tulane, on the downriver side. Audubon Place, where the President of Tulane resides, is on the upriver side. The President's residence is the former home of "banana king" Sam Zemurray, who donated it in his will.

The centerpiece of the Gibson Quad is the first academic building built on campus, Gibson Hall, in 1894. The School of Architecture is also located on the oldest section of the campus, occupying the Richardson Memorial Building. The middle of the campus, between Feret and Willow Streets, and bisected by McAlister Place and Newcomb Place, serves as the center of campus activities. The Lavin-Bernick Center for University Life, Devlin Fieldhouse, McAlister Auditorium, Howard-Tilton Memorial Library, and most of the student residence halls and academic buildings populate the center of campus.

The Howard-Tilton Memorial Library is located on Freret Street. It was under construction from 2013 to 2016, but it now has two additional floors, as well as a Rare Books room. The facilities for the Freeman School of Business line McAlister Place and sit next to the Tulane University Law School. The center of campus is also home to the historic Newcomb College Campus, which sits between Newcomb Place and Broadway. The Newcomb campus was designed by New York architect James Gamble Rogers, noted for his work with Yale University's campus. The Newcomb campus is home to Tulane's performing and fine arts venues.

The back of campus, between Willow Street and South Claiborne, is home to two residence halls (Aron Residences and Décou-Labat Residences), Reily Recreation Center, and Turchin Stadium, and in January 2013, ground was broken on Tulane's Yulman Stadium between Reily Recreation Center and Turchin Stadium. Tulane Green Wave football had played in the Mercedes-Benz Superdome since Tulane Stadium's demolition in 1980. They now play in Yulman Stadium, which opened in September 2014.

After Hurricane Katrina, Tulane has continued to build new facilities and renovate old spaces on its campus. The newest dorm buildings, Lake and River Residence Halls, were completed in 2023 following the demolition of Phelps Hall and Irby Hall. Weatherhead Hall was completed in 2011, and it now houses sophomore students. Construction on Greenbaum House, a Residential College in the Newcomb Campus area, began in January 2013 and was completed by Summer 2014. The Lallage Feazel Wall Residential College was completed in August 2005 and took in its first students when Tulane re-opened in January 2006. Usually an honors dorm, Wall began accommodating students of all academic standings during the COVID-19 pandemic. The Lavin-Bernick Center for University Life (LBC) was renovated to be a green, environmentally friendly building and opened for student use in January 2007. In 2009, the university altered McAlister Drive, a street that ran through the middle of the uptown campus into a pedestrian walkway renamed McAlister Place. The area was resurfaced, and the newly added green spaces were adorned with Japanese magnolias, irises and new lighting. In late November 2008 the City of New Orleans announced plans to add bicycle lanes to the St. Charles Avenue corridor that runs in front of campus.

In 2019, a new student space located in the middle of the uptown campus, The Malkin Sacks Commons, was opened by President Mike Fitts. The Commons is the central dining area on campus. Catering to most dietary restrictions, The Commons directly connects to the Lavin-Bernick Center on the second floor, and on its third floor houses the Newcomb Institute.

=== Graduate housing ===
There is one graduate housing complex for Tulane University, Bertie M. and John W. Deming Pavilion, in the Downtown Campus. As of 2016 it is not operated by the university's Department of Housing and Residence Life.

There were previously two other complexes:

- Global Collective, a graduate student housing complex on the Uptown campus of Tulane university operated by the university's Department of Housing and Residence Life
- Papillon Apartments, an apartment complex in the Lower Garden District operated by the university's Department of Housing and Residence Life for graduate students and their families. It was managed by HRI Properties. The university acquired the building circa 2005, which previously served as an apartment for people unaffiliated with the university. The university initially paid the taxes for the apartments of legacy non-Tulane residents but began charging the taxes to these tenants in 2013. In June 2016 the university announced it would not renew the leases of the non-Tulane tenants.

=== Other campuses ===
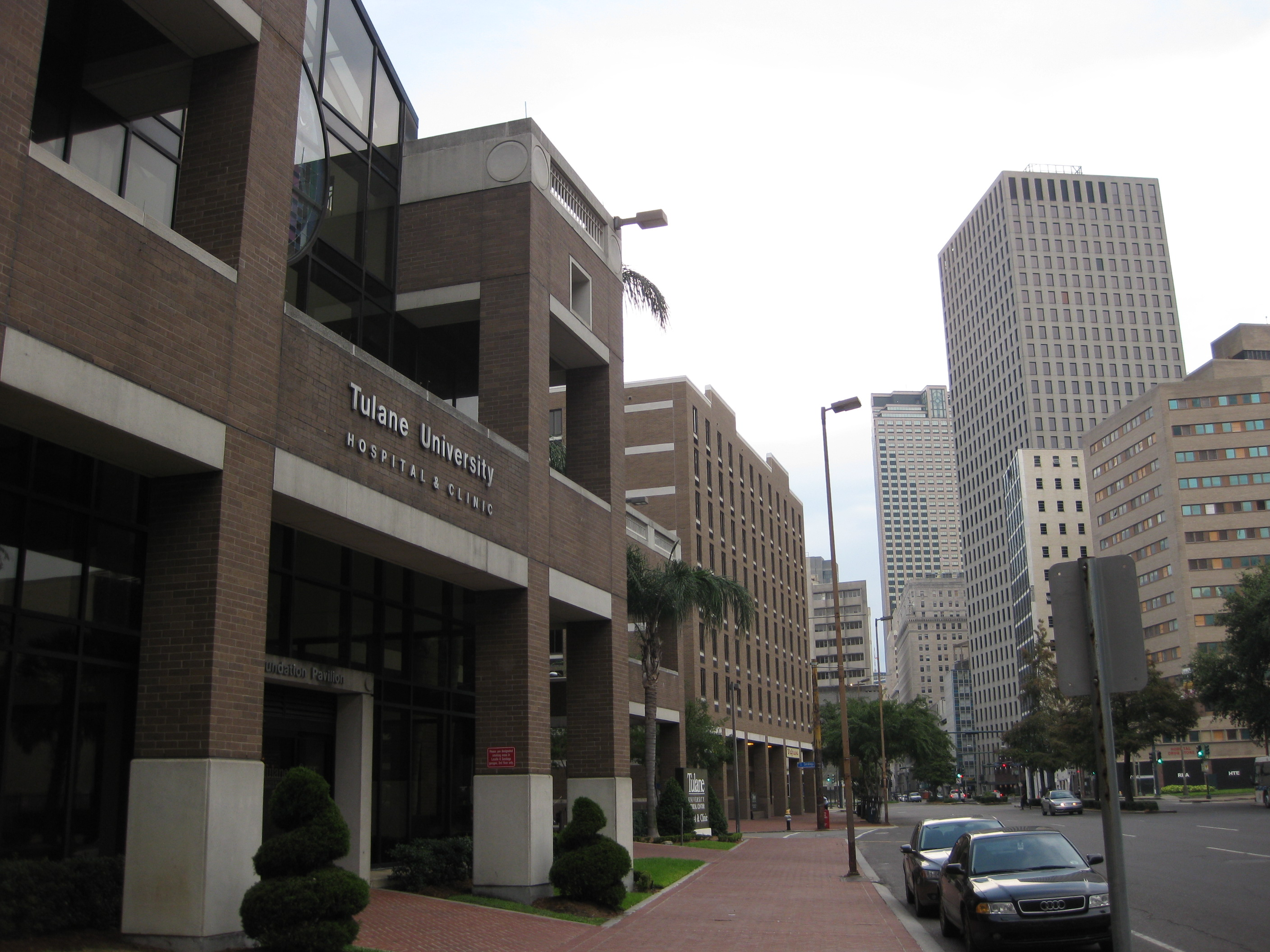
Tulane University Hospital, located in the Medical District of downtown New Orleans and adjacent to the School of Medicine

The Tulane University Health Sciences campus is located in the downtown New Orleans Central Business District between the Mercedes-Benz Superdome and Canal Street in 18 mid/high-rise buildings, which house the School of Medicine, the School of Public Health and Tropical Medicine, and the main campus of the Tulane Medical Center. In addition to medical and public health education, the Health Sciences campus is the central location for biomedical research. Students and faculty from the Health Sciences campus are also involved in community-wide health promotion, such as community health fairs and distributing condoms to address the high rate of STIs in New Orleans. In 2014, the Tulane University School of Social Work relocated from the Uptown campus to the Health Sciences campus, with facilities located in a renovated historic building on Elk Place.

Tulane University Square consists of 80,000 square feet (7,400 m^{2}) of space and 6 acres (24,000 m^{2}) of surrounding land located on Broadway and Leake Avenue adjacent to the Mississippi River.

Outside of New Orleans, the Tulane National Primate Research Center in Covington, Louisiana is one of eight such centers funded by the National Institutes of Health. The F. Edward Hebert Research Center near Belle Chasse, Louisiana, provides facilities for graduate training and research in computer science, bioengineering, and biology. Satellite campuses of the School of Continuing Studies, Tulane's open admissions school of continuing studies, are located in downtown New Orleans, in Elmwood, Louisiana, and in Biloxi, Mississippi. From 2010 to 2017, Tulane also operated a satellite campus in Madison, Mississippi.

Tulane offers an executive MBA program in Cali, Colombia; Santiago, Chile; Shanghai, China; and Taipei, Taiwan.

=== Environmental sustainability ===
Tulane hosted an Environmental Summit at its law school in April 2009, an event that all students could attend for free. Many students from Tulane's two active environmental groups, Green Club and Environmental Law Society, attended. These student groups push for global citizenship and environmental stewardship on campus. In 2007 Tulane made a commitment to reduce greenhouse gas emissions by 10%, getting students involved by providing an Energy Smart Shopping Guide and electronics "greening" services from IT. In 2010 Tulane completed its renovation of 88-year-old Dinwiddie Hall, which was subsequently LEED Gold certified. A new residential college, Weatherhead Hall, opened in 2011 as housing for sophomore honors students. The residence has also applied for LEED Gold certification. Tulane received an "A−" on the 2011 College Sustainability Report Card, garnering an award as one of the top 52 most sustainable colleges in the country.

== Organization and administration ==
Tulane University, as a private institution, has been governed since 1884 by the Board of Tulane (also known as the Board of Administrators of the Tulane Educational Fund) that was established in 1882. There have been 15 presidents of Tulane since then. The board comprises more than 30 regular members (plus several members emeriti) and the university president. In 2008, Tulane became one of 76 U.S. colleges and the only Louisiana college to maintain an endowment above $1 billion.

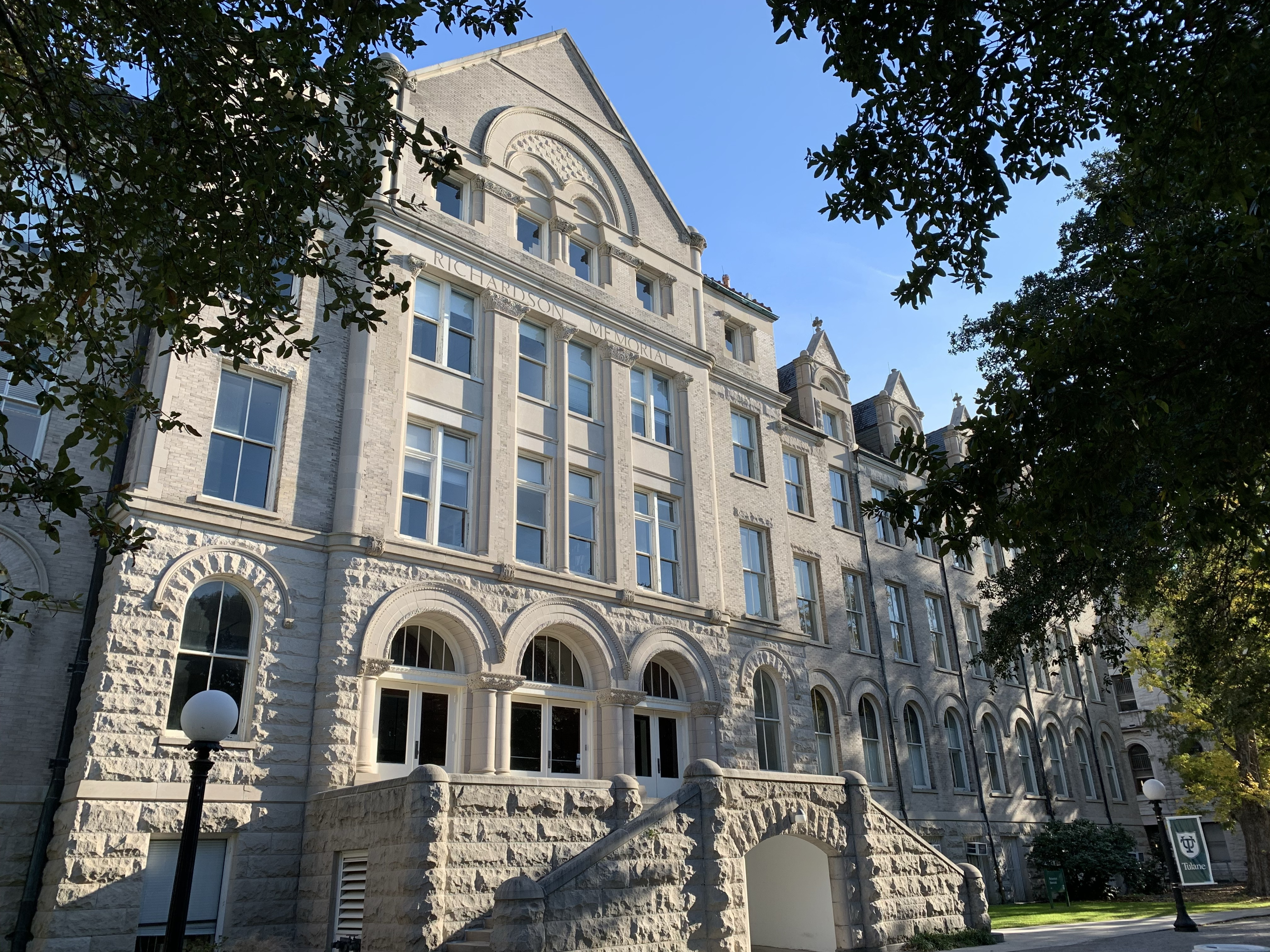
Richardson Memorial Hall, constructed 1908, home of the Tulane School of Architecture

Tulane is organized into 10 schools centered around liberal arts, sciences, and specialized professions. All undergraduate students are enrolled in the Newcomb-Tulane College. The graduate programs are governed by the individual schools. Newcomb-Tulane College serves as an administrative center for all aspects of undergraduate life at Tulane, while individual schools direct specific courses of study.

The first architecture courses at Tulane leading to an architectural engineering degree were offered in 1894. After beginning as part of the College of Technology, the Tulane School of Architecture was separately formed as a school in 1953.

The A.B. Freeman School of Business was named in honor of Alfred Bird Freeman, former chair of the Louisiana Coca-Cola Bottling Co. and a prominent New Orleans philanthropist and civic leader. The business school is ranked 44th nationally and 28th among programs at private universities by Forbes magazine. U.S. News & World Report's Best Graduate Schools 2015 edition ranked the MBA program 63rd overall.

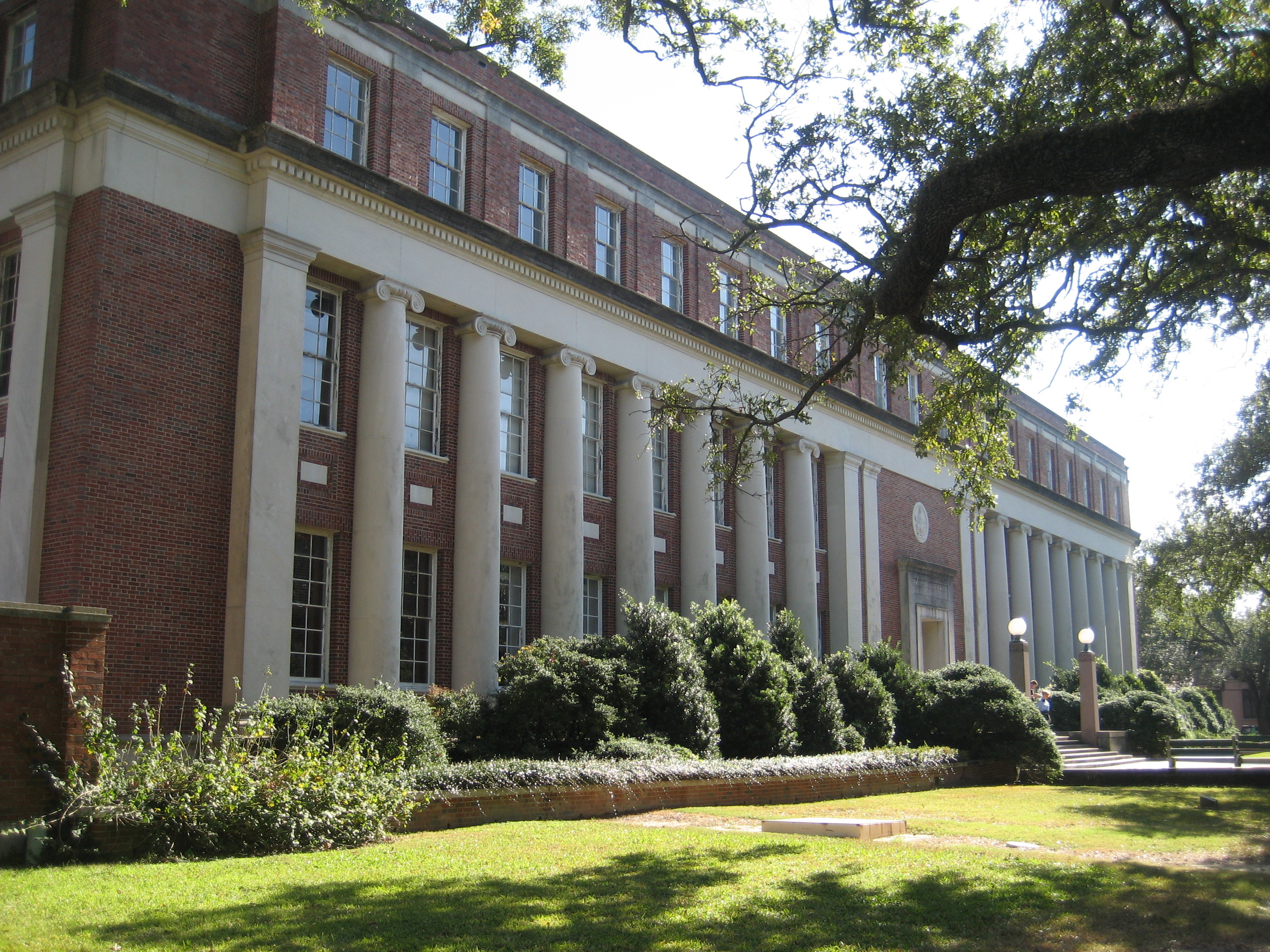
Jones Hall, where the School of Law was located from 1969 until 1995. It now acts as a Special Collections library and houses Classical Studies, Jewish Studies, and Stone Center for Latin American Studies.

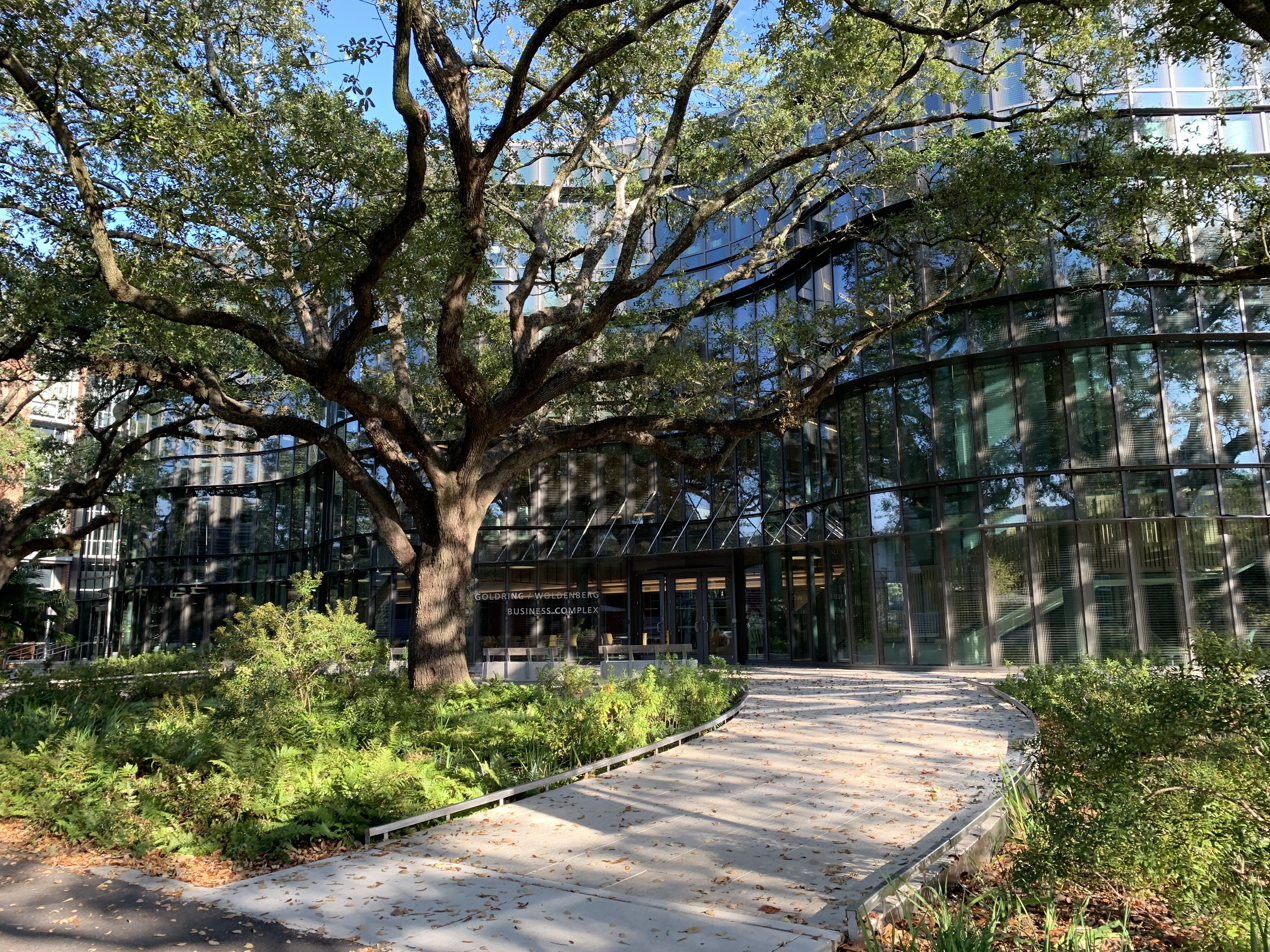
The A.B. Freeman School of Business

The Tulane University Law School, established in 1847, is the 12th oldest law school in the United States. In 1990, it became the first law school in the United States to mandate pro bono work as a graduation requirement. U.S. News & World Report's 2015 edition ranked the School of Law 46th overall and 6th in environmental law, while the 2022 edition ranked the School of Law 60th overall. "The Law School 100" ranks Tulane as 34th, relying on a qualitative (rather than quantitative) assessment. The 2010 Leiter law-school rankings put Tulane at 38th, based on student quality, using LSAT and GPA data. The Hylton law-school rankings, conducted in 2006, put Tulane at 39th. The school's maritime law program is widely considered to be the best in the United States, with the Tulane Maritime Law Journal being the paramount admiralty law journal of the country. In May 2007, Tulane Law announced a Strategic Plan to increase student selectivity by gradually reducing the incoming JD class size from a historical average of 350 students per year to a target of 250 students per year within several years.

The School of Liberal Arts encompasses 16 departments and 19 interdisciplinary programs in the social sciences, humanities, and fine and performing arts—including 50 undergraduate majors and two dozen M.A., M.F.A., and Ph.D. programs—plus the Shakespeare Festival, Summer Lyric Theatre, Carroll Gallery, Tulane Marching Band, and the Middle America Research Institute. The School of Liberal Arts is the largest of Tulane's nine schools with the greatest number of enrolled students, faculty members, majors, minors, and graduate programs.

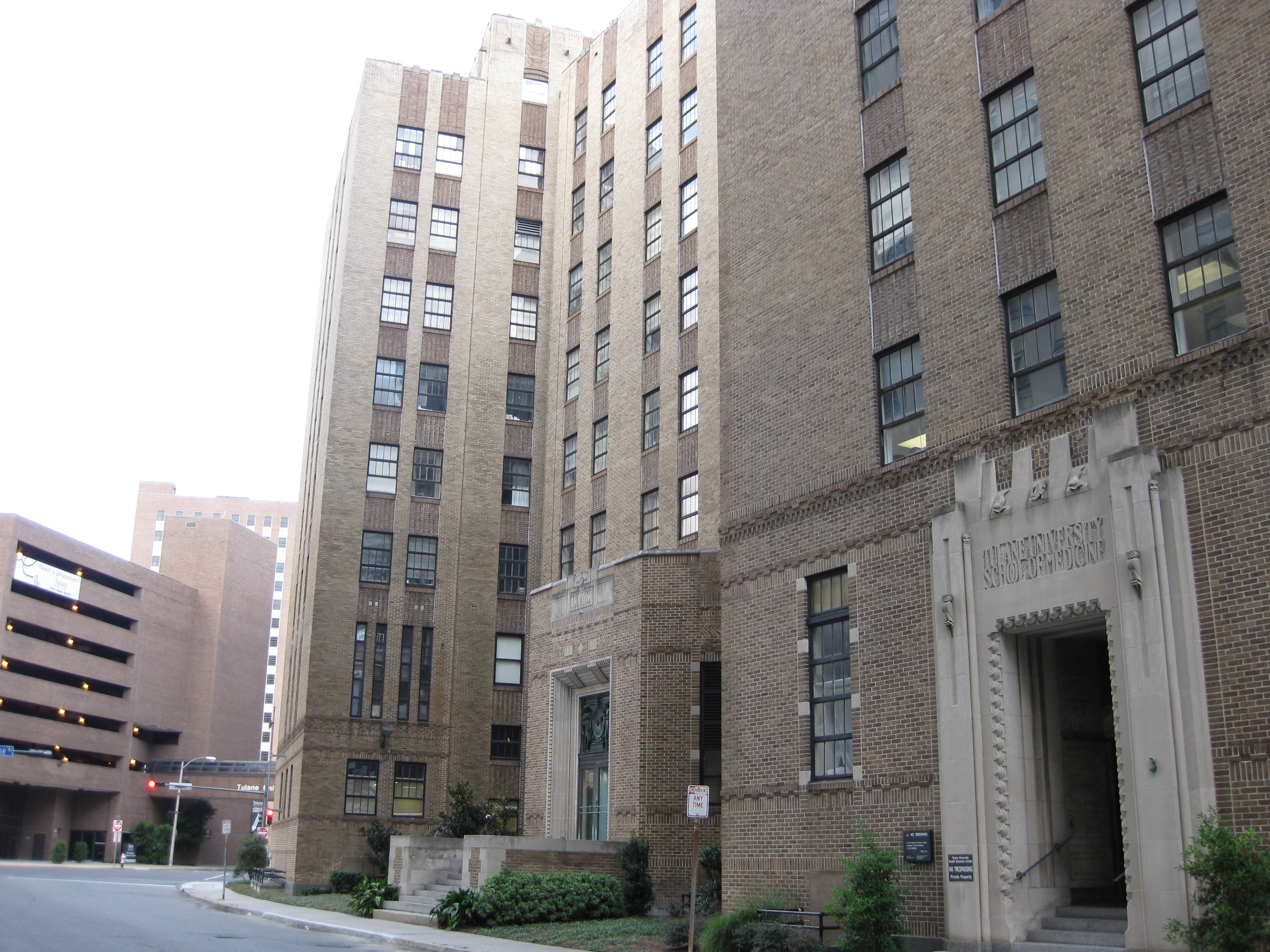
The School of Medicine, located in Downtown New Orleans

The Tulane University School of Medicine was founded in 1834 and is the 15th oldest medical school in the United States. Faculty have been noted for innovation. For example, in 1850 J. Lawrence Smith invented the inverted microscope. In the following year John Leonard Riddell invented the first practical microscope to allow binocular viewing through a single objective lens. In 2001 the Tulane Center for Gene Therapy started as the first major center in the U.S. to focus on research using adult stem cells. The school has highly selective admissions, accepting only 175 medical students from more than 10,000 applications. It comprises 20 academic departments.

The Tulane University Celia Scott Weatherhead School of Public Health and Tropical Medicine is the first public health school established in the U.S. Although a program in hygiene was initiated in 1881, the School of Hygiene and Tropical Medicine was not established until 1912 as a separate entity from the College of Medicine. In 1919 the separate school ceased to be an independent unit and was merged with the College of Medicine. By 1967 the School of Public Health and Tropical Medicine reestablished as a separate academic unit of Tulane. In the fall of 2006, the School of Public Health began admitting undergraduate students, and in 2024 it was named for Tulane donor Celia Scott Weatherhead. It has been ranked 10th nationally among schools and programs of public health in the U.S. News & World Report's Best Public Health Schools 2025 edition. It comprises seven academic departments.

The Tulane University School of Science and Engineering was established in 2005.

In 1914 the Southern School of Social Sciences and Public Services was the first training program for social workers in the Deep South. By 1927 the school became a separate program with a two-year Master of Arts. The Tulane University School of Social Work has awarded the master of social work degrees to more than 4,700 students from all 50 of the United States and more than 30 other countries.

Tulane offers continuing education courses and bachelor's degrees through the Tulane School of Professional Advancement. Tulane has several academic and research institutes and centers including The Murphy Institute, Newcomb College Center for Research on Women, The Roger Thayer Stone Center for Latin American Studies, the Middle American Research Institute, and the law school's Payson Center for International Development.

== Academics ==
As part of the post-Hurricane Katrina Renewal Plan, the university initiated an extensive university-wide core curriculum. Several major elements of the university core include freshman seminars called TIDES classes, a two-tier writing course sequence, and a two-tier course sequence for public service. Many other course requirements of the core curriculum can be certified through Advanced Placement (AP) or International Baccalaureate (IB) exam scores, or placement exams in English and foreign languages offered by the university before course registration. Some schools' core requirements differ (e.g., students in the School of Science and Engineering are required to take fewer language classes than students in the School of Liberal Arts).

=== Research ===
Tulane was elected to the Association of American Universities in 1958. It is classified among "R1: Doctoral Universities – Very high research activity" and had research expenditure of $258.439 million in fiscal year 2023.

In 2008, Tulane was ranked by the Ford Foundation as the major international studies research institution in the South and one of the top 15 nationally. The National Institutes of Health ranks funding to Tulane at 79th. The university is home to various research centers, including the Amistad Research Center.

- Fulbright Scholars: 155
- Rhodes Scholars: 17
- Marshall Scholars: 23
- Goldwater Scholars: 31
- Truman Scholars: 13
- National Science Foundation Fellows: 33

=== Rankings ===
Academic rankings

National
- Forbes: 147
- U.S. News & World Report: 59 (tie)
- Washington Monthly: 431
- WSJ/College Pulse: 71

Global
- ARWU: 501–600
- QS: =597
- THE: 401–500
- U.S. News & World Report: 408

National Program Rankings
Program	Ranking
Biological Sciences	98
Business	74
Chemistry	106
Earth Sciences	103
Economics	72
Engineering	109
English	85
Fine Arts	135
Health Care Management	17
History	63
Law	54
Mathematics	74
Physics	100
Political Science	89
Psychology	148
Public Health	13
Social Work	36
Sociology	87

Global Subject Rankings
Program	Ranking
Biology & Biochemistry	399
Cardiac & Cardiovascular Systems	214
Clinical Medicine	199
Immunology	238
Molecular Biology & Genetics	265
Neuroscience & Behavior	397
Oncology	220
Social Sciences & Public Health	275
Surgery	180

Overall university rankings and ratings include:

- One of 195 U.S. universities recognized by the Carnegie Foundation for the Advancement of Teaching with a "community engagement" classification.
- The 2027 edition of U.S. News & World Report ranked Tulane tied for 59th among U.S. national universities. In addition, U.S. News & World Report ranked Tulane tied for 113th in "Best Undergraduate Engineering Program", 5th in "Service Learning" and 100th for "Best Value" among national universities.
- Tulane held multiple rankings from The Princeton Review in 2023: Best Quality of Life (#7), Best-Run Colleges (#22), Happiest Students (#1), Lots of Beer (#4), Lots of Hard Liquor (#5), Most Engaged in Community Service (#2), Their Students Love These Colleges (#6).
- Forbes magazine ranked Tulane 106th in 2019 out of 650 U.S. universities, colleges and service academies.

=== Admissions ===
According to U.S. News & World Report Tulane is deemed a "Most Selective" university. Tulane is the only institution in Louisiana to have that distinction. The school accepts the Common Application for admission. Tulane has the second lowest percentage of Pell Grant recipients in the United States, only after Fairfield University. It is need-blind for domestic applicants.

The Office of Undergraduate Admission received over 32,000 applications for the class of 2029, and 4,700 were admitted. The acceptance rate for the class of 2029 was 14.7 percent. Among freshman students who committed to enroll in Fall 2025, the average converted SAT score was 1486. Composite ACT scores for the middle 50% ranged from 32 to 34.

In November, 2026, the Tulane Office of Admissions announced that it had received a 100% increase in early applications for the class of 2031.

==== Honors program admissions ====
The Office of Admission invites selected Incoming undergraduate students to join the honors program. Incoming freshmen who did not receive an invitation are allowed to apply for one after completing their first semester with at least a 3.8 cumulative GPA. To remain in good standing with the honors program, honors students are required to maintain at least a 3.8 cumulative GPA and enroll in honors classes their first year in the program. Students in the honors program have access to additional academic opportunities and resources campus.

In 2021, the Newcomb-Tulane College (NTC) created programming for First Year Honors Scholars and phased out its honors program. Many of the components of the honors program have been incorporated into other NTC programs.

=== Scholarships ===
The Dean's Honor Scholarship is a merit-based scholarship awarded by Tulane which covers full tuition for the duration of the recipient's undergraduate program. The scholarship is offered to between 75 and 100 incoming freshmen by the Office of Undergraduate Admission and is awarded only through a separate application. This scholarship is renewable provided that the recipient maintains a minimum 3.0 GPA at the end of each semester and maintains continuous enrollment in a full-time undergraduate division. Typically, recipients have SAT I score of 1450 or higher or an ACT composite score of 33 or higher, rank in the top 5% of their high school graduating class, have a rigorous course load including honors and Advanced Placement classes, and an outstanding record of extracurricular activities. Notable recipients include Sean M. Berkowitz and David Filo.

Beginning in 2014, Tulane has partnered with the Stamps Family Charitable Foundation to offer the full-ride merit-based Stamps Leadership Scholarship, Tulane's most prestigious scholarship. Approximately 5 incoming students are awarded the Stamps Scholarship each year, and Tulane graduated its first class of Stamps Scholars in May 2018.

== Student life ==
Student body composition as of March 2, 2026
Race and ethnicity	Total
White	65%
Hispanic	11%
Black	7%
Other (Note: Other consists of Multiracial Americans & those who prefer to not say.)	6%
Foreign national	6%
Asian	6%
Economic diversity
Low-income (Note: The percentage of students who received an income-based federal Pell grant intended for low-income students.)	10%

The student body of Tulane University is represented by the Associated Student Body (ASB). In 1998, the students of Tulane University voted by referendum to split the Associated Student Body (ASB) Senate into two separate houses, the Undergraduate Student Government (USG) and the Graduate and Professional Student Association (GAPSA). USG and GAPSA came together twice a semester to meet as the ASB Senate, where issues pertaining to the entire Tulane student body were discussed, presided over by the ASB President. However, starting in 2021, Tulane students and administrators collaborated to create a new student governance model. The USG was dissolved, and in its place, the Tulane Undergraduate Assembly (TUA) was formed.

Tulane maintains 3,600 beds in 14 residence halls on its uptown campus for undergraduate students. First year residence halls include Warren House, Sharp Hall, Monroe Hall, Paterson Hall, Josephine Louise Hall, Wall Hall, and Butler Hall. Sophomore residence halls include Aron Residences, Décou-Labat Residences, Greenbaum Hall, Lake Hall, River Hall, and Weatherhead Hall. Per the Renewal Plan instituted after Hurricane Katrina, Tulane requires all freshmen and sophomores to live on campus, except those who are from surrounding neighborhoods in New Orleans. Due to the increasing size of incoming classes, Tulane has allowed a small number of rising sophomores to reside off campus instead of being required to remain in campus housing. Housing is not guaranteed for juniors and seniors.

=== Student media ===
The Tulane Hullabaloo is the university's weekly student-run newspaper.

=== Athletics ===
Wordmark for Tulane Athletics

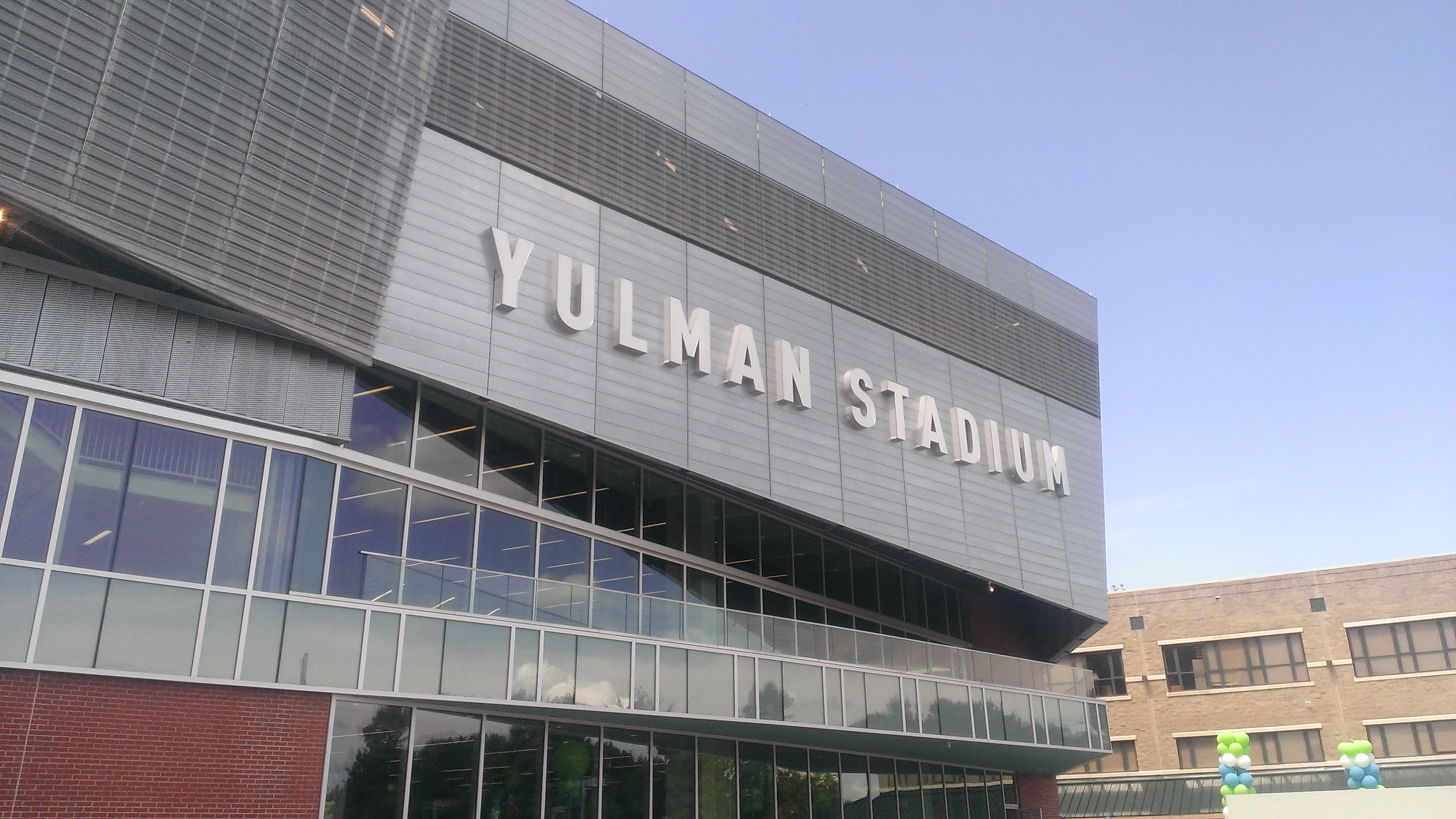
Tulane's football team plays its home games Uptown in Yulman Stadium.

Tulane competes in NCAA Division I as a member of the American Conference (The American). The university was a charter member of the Southeastern Conference, in which it competed until 1966. Just before leaving the SEC, it had notably become the first conference school to field a black athlete when Stephen Martin, who was on an academic scholarship, played on the baseball team in the 1966 season. Tulane, along with other academically oriented, private schools had considered forming the "Southern Ivy League" (Magnolia Conference) in the 1950s. Tulane's intercollegiate sports include football, baseball, men's and women's basketball, women's volleyball, men's and women's track, men's and women's tennis, and cross country, women's swimming and diving, women's tennis, women's golf, women's bowling, and women's beach volleyball. Tulane's graduation rate for its student-athletes consistently ranks among the top of Division I athletics programs.

Tulane Green Wave teams have seen moderate success over the years. The school's national championships have all come from men's tennis, with one team title in 1959 and multiple singles and doubles titles. The baseball team has won multiple conference titles, and in both 2001 and 2005, it finished with 56 wins and placed 5th at the College World Series. The women's basketball team has won multiple conference titles and gone to numerous NCAA tournaments. The women's volleyball team won the 2008 Conference USA Championship tournament. The Green Wave football team won the 2002 Hawaii Bowl, the 1970 Liberty Bowl, and the inaugural Sugar Bowl. In 1998 it went 12–0, winning the Liberty Bowl and finishing the season ranked 7th in the nation by the AP and 10th by the BCS. On January 2, 2023, Tulane beat a favored USC team in the Cotton Bowl, finishing the 2022 season with a 12–2 record.

Most administrative and athletic support facilities are located in the Wilson Athletic Center in the center of Tulane's athletic campus. The adjacent area was once home to Tulane Stadium, which seated more than 80,000 people, held three Super Bowls, was home to the New Orleans Saints, and gave rise to the Sugar Bowl. Home football games moved to the Mercedes-Benz Superdome when it opened in 1975, and Tulane Stadium was demolished in 1980. The university has committed to upgrading its athletic facilities in recent years, extensively renovating Turchin Stadium (baseball) in 2008, Fogelman Arena (now Devlin Fieldhouse; basketball and volleyball) in 2006 and 2012, and Goldring Tennis Center in 2008. The Hertz Center, a new practice facility for the basketball and volleyball teams that includes athletic training and strength and conditioning rooms, offices, film rooms, and lockers, opened in 2011. Tulane completed construction of Yulman Stadium in September 2014 and began using it for home football games that season.

== Notable people ==
Tulane is home to many alumni who have contributed to both the arts and sciences and to the political and business realms. For example, from television: Jerry Springer and Ian Terry, from literature: John Kennedy Toole, Pulitzer Prize-winning author of A Confederacy of Dunces, Shirley Ann Grau, Pulitzer Prize for Fiction winner, and conservative journalist Andrew Breitbart, who later criticized his education at Tulane for what he perceived as its inadequacy; from business: David Filo, co-founder of Yahoo!, Ashley Biden, daughter of Jill Biden and Joseph R. Biden and Neil Bush, economist and brother of President George W. Bush; from spirituality: Joan Halifax, Zen Buddhist teacher and author of several books on Buddhism and spirituality; from entertainment: Lauren Hutton, film actor and supermodel, and Paul Michael Glaser, TV actor of Starsky and Hutch; from fine arts: Sergio Rossetti Morosini, artist and conservator, and internationally renowned glass artist Mitchell Gaudet; from music: conductor and composer Odaline de la Martinez, who was the first woman to conduct at a BBC Proms concert in London; from government: Newt Gingrich, former Speaker of the House who famously coordinated the first Congressional Republican majority in 40 years, Perry Chen, founder of Kickstarter and Luther Terry, former U.S. Surgeon General who issued the first official health hazard warning for tobacco; from medicine: Michael DeBakey and Dr. Regina Benjamin, President Obama's Surgeon General; from science: A. Baldwin Wood, inventor of the wood screw pump and Lisa P. Jackson, United States Environmental Protection Agency (EPA) Administrator under President Obama; from sports: Bobby Brown, former New York Yankees third baseman and former president of the American League. A former graduate residence hall on campus was also named for Engineering graduate Harold Rosen, who invented the geosynchronous communications satellite. Douglas G. Hurley, NASA astronaut and pilot of mission STS-127, became the first alumnus to travel in outer space in July 2009.

Tulane also hosted several prominent faculty, such as two members who each won the Nobel Prize in Physiology or Medicine: Louis J. Ignarro and Andrew V. Schally. Other notables such as Rudolph Matas, "father of vascular surgery" and George E. Burch, inventor of the phlebomanometer in medicine, also were on faculty at Tulane. Five U.S. Supreme Court Justices have taught at Tulane, including Chief Justice William Rehnquist. Tulane has also hosted several prominent artists, most notably Mark Rothko, who was a Visiting Artist from 1956 to 1957. Currently on the faculty are Walter Isaacson, Nick Spitzer, Olawale Sulaiman and Melissa Harris-Perry.

Several football alumni played in the National Football League, including five-time NFL Champion Wide Receiver Max McGee, Mewelde Moore, Matt Forté, Troy Kropog, Dezman Moses, Cairo Santos (Chicago Bears), Darnell Mooney (Chicago Bears), Tyjae Spears (Tennessee Titans), and Super Bowl champion Shaun King (Tampa Bay).

Several baseball alumni played in the Major Leagues, including Brian Bogusevic (Chicago Cubs), Brandon Gomes (Tampa Bay Rays), Mark Hamilton (free agent), Aaron Loup (Toronto Blue Jays), Tommy Manzella (Colorado Rockies), Micah Owings (Washington Nationals), and J. P. France (Houston Astros). Jack Cressend(Los Angeles dodgers

Actor Harold Sylvester was the first African American to receive an athletic scholarship from Tulane. Turning down Harvard, he attended Tulane on a basketball scholarship and graduated in 1972 with a degree in theater and psychology.

Shalanda Young, who is an American political advisor who is the nominee to serve as deputy director of the Office of Management and Budget (OMB) in the Biden administration, graduated with her Masters in Health Administration.

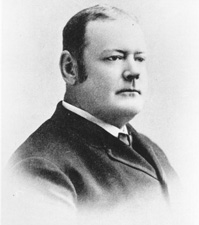
Edward Douglass White, 9th Chief Justice of the United States

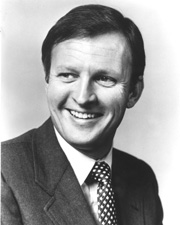
William L. Armstrong, leading welfare reform legislator, United States Representative and Senator, businessman

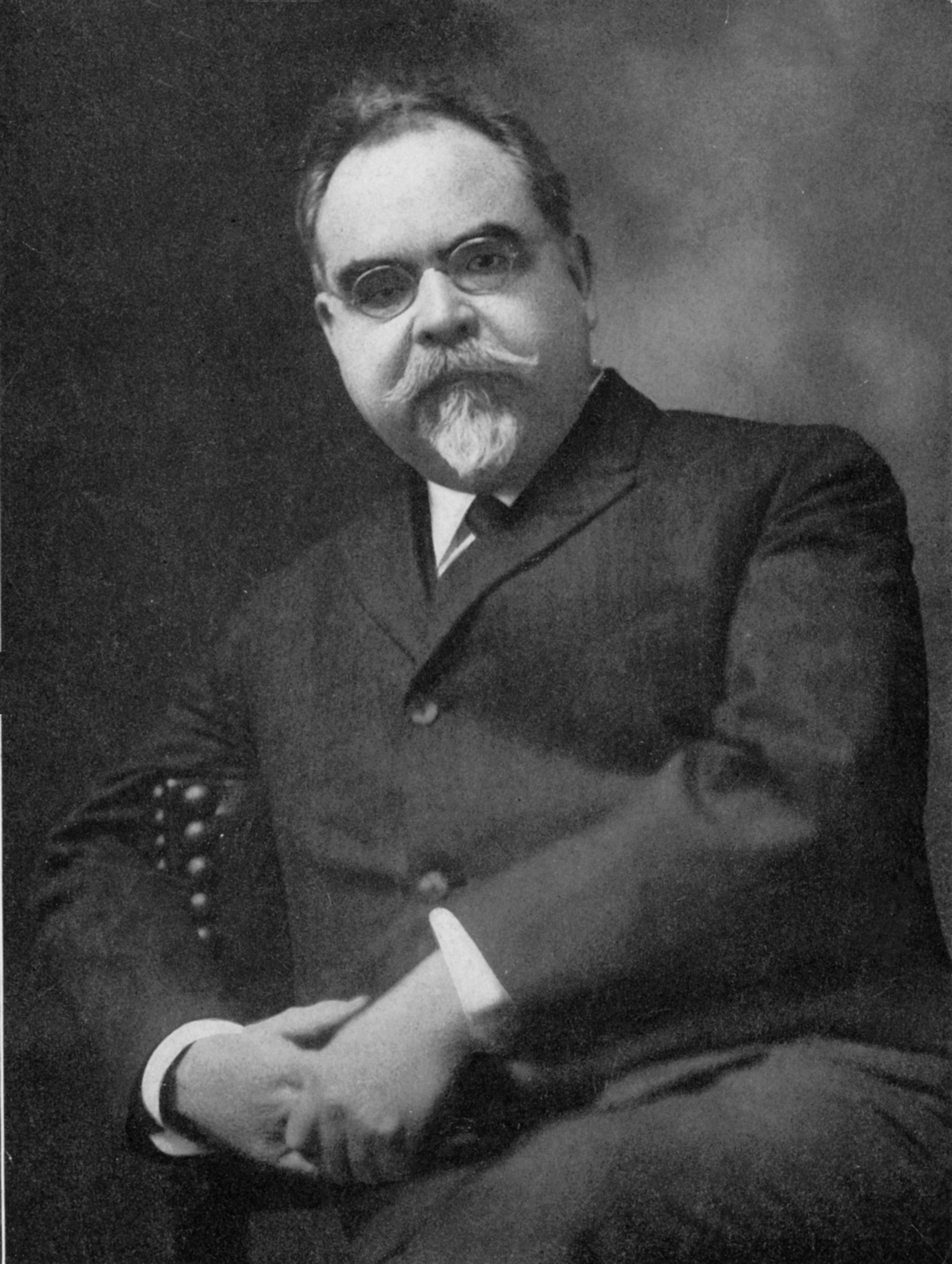
Rudolph Matas, regarded as the "father of vascular surgery", 9th President of the American College of Surgeons

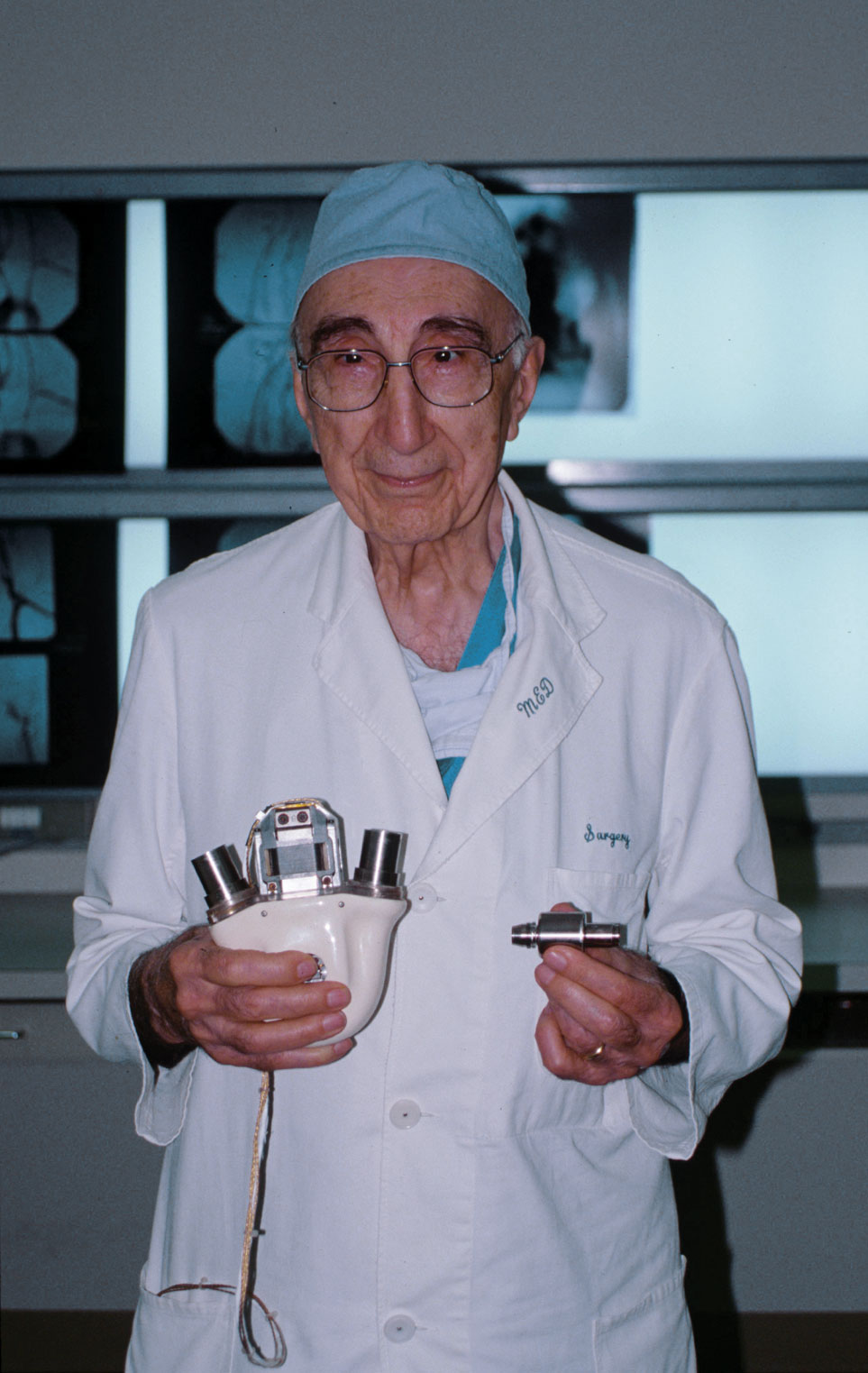
Michael E. DeBakey, regarded as the "father of modern cardiovascular surgery", prolific inventor

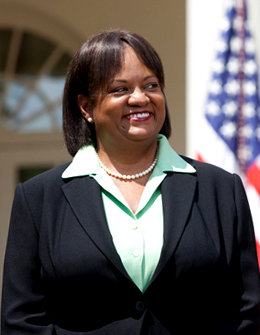
Regina Benjamin, 18th Surgeon General of the United States

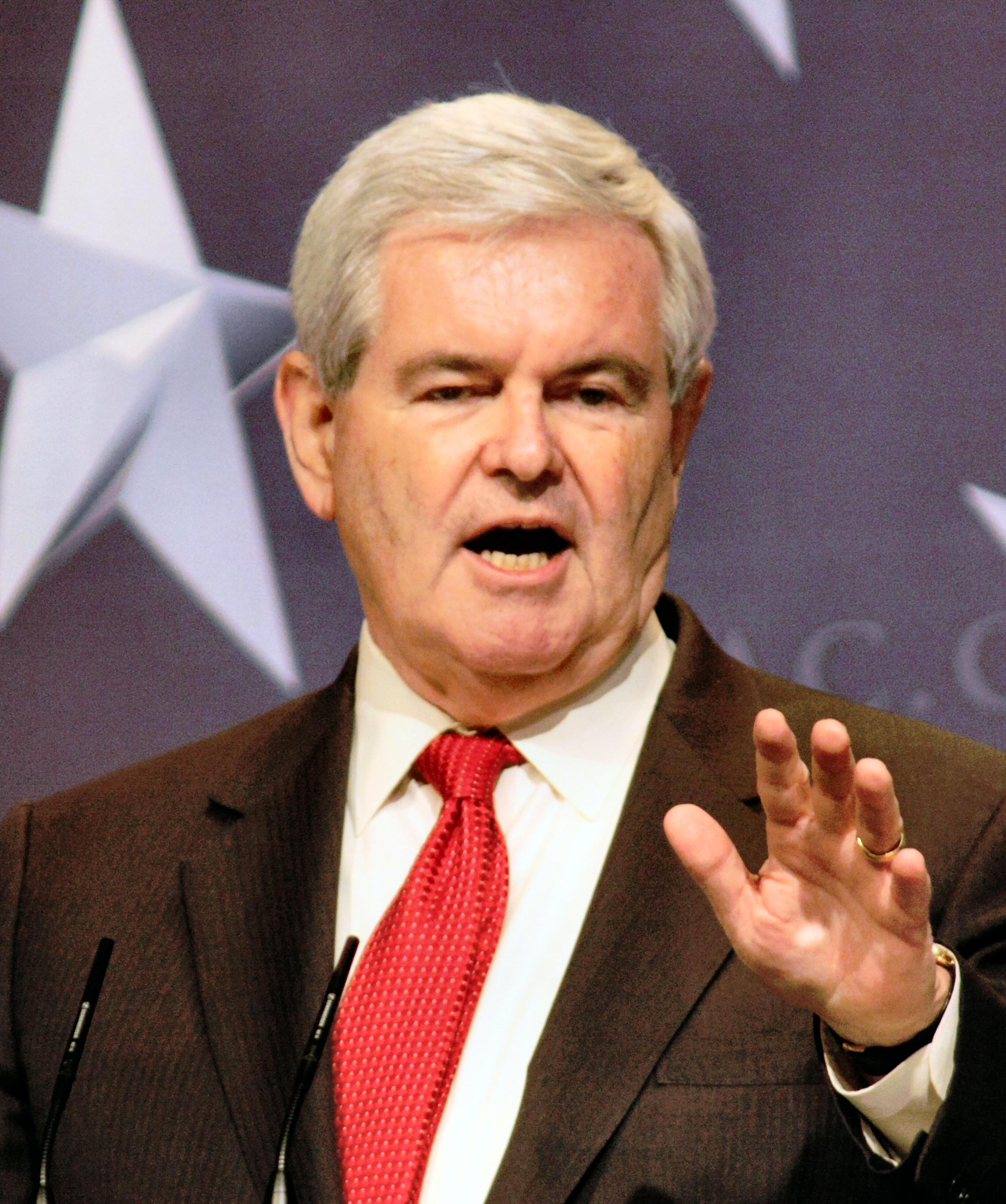
Newt Gingrich, 50th Speaker of the House of Representatives

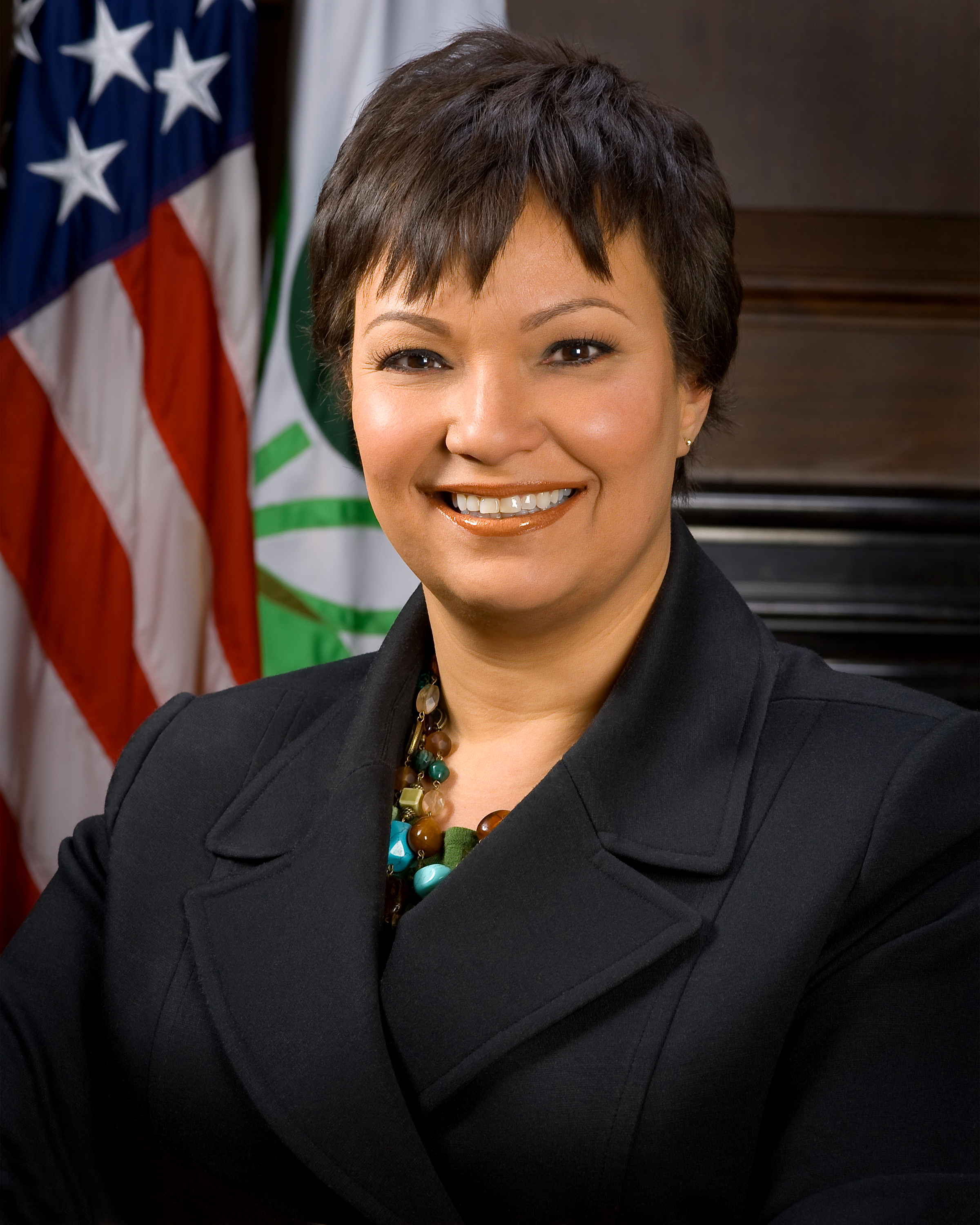
Lisa P. Jackson, 12th Administrator of the Environmental Protection Agency

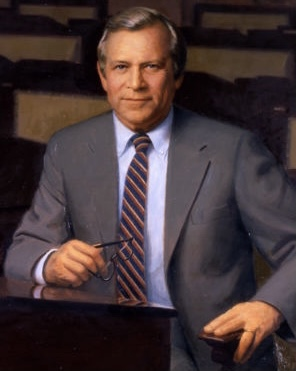
Howard Baker, U.S. Senate Majority Leader, 12th White House Chief of Staff, 26th United States Ambassador to Japan

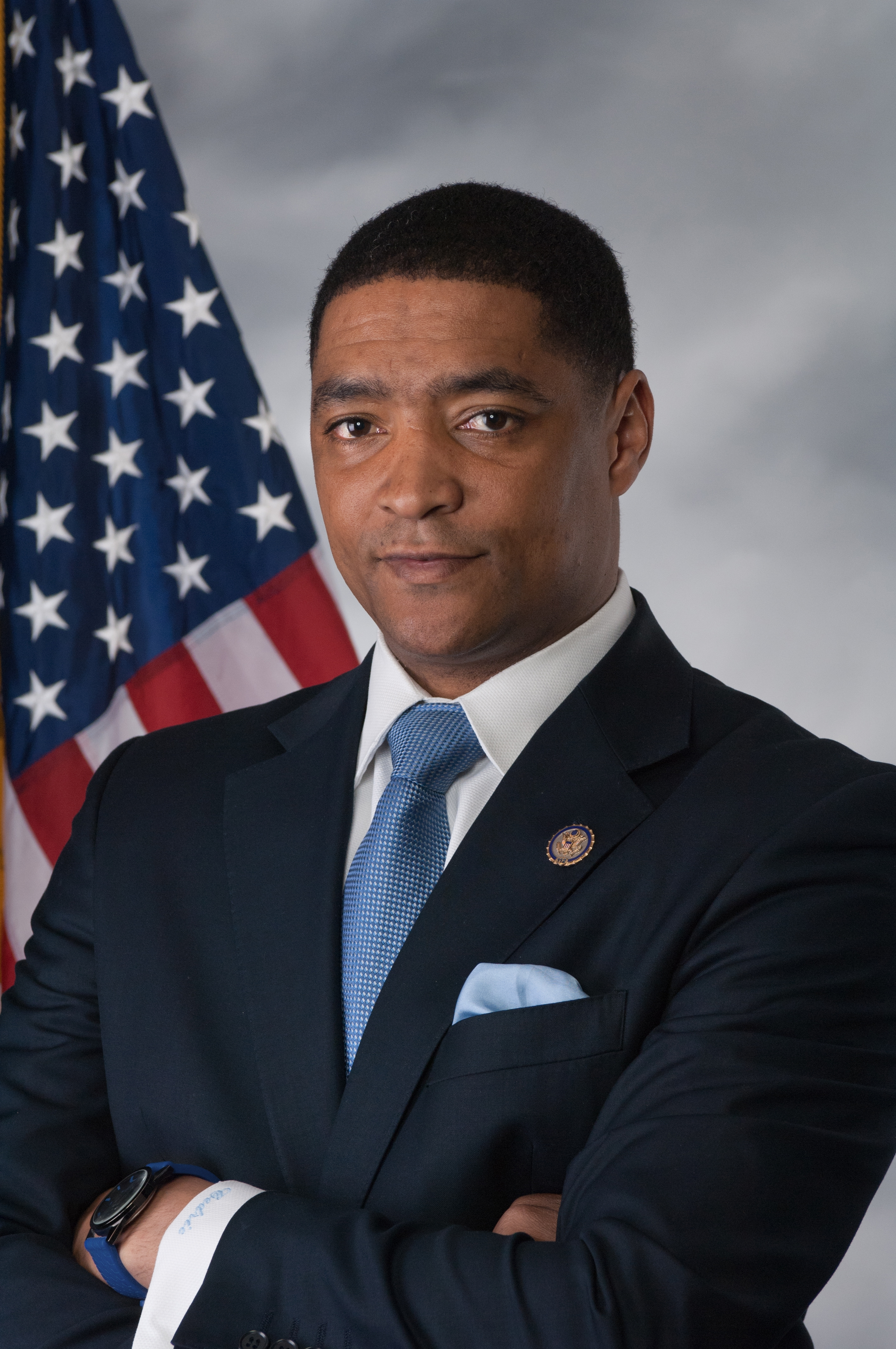
Cedric Richmond, 25th Director of the Office of Public Liaison

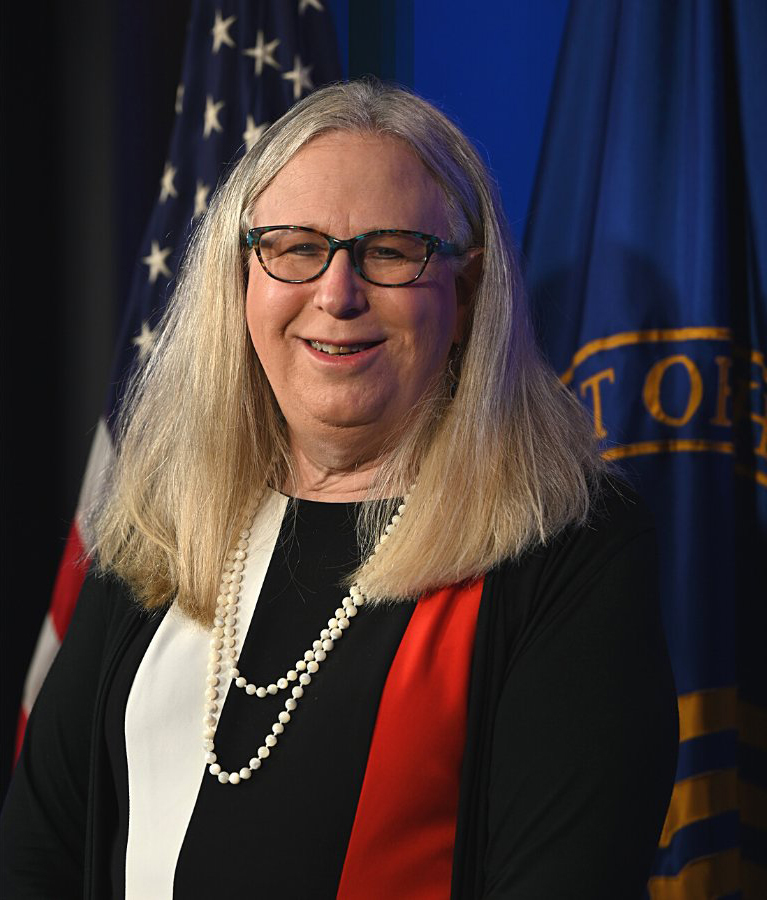
Rachel Levine, 17th Assistant Secretary for Health, first openly transgender federal official to be confirmed by the U.S. Senate

== In literature and media ==
Tulane has been portrayed in several books, television shows and films. These films include The Perfect Date, So Undercover, The Pelican Brief, College, and 22 Jump Street. Several movies have been filmed at the Uptown campus, especially since tax credits from the state of Louisiana began drawing more productions to New Orleans in the early 2000s. The Uptown campus has hosted two movie premieres from 2006 to 2007.

== See also ==
- National Register of Historic Places listings in Orleans Parish, Louisiana
- Newcomb Art Museum
- A Studio in the Woods
