= Howard-Tilton Memorial Library =

Academic library

Coordinates: 29.9399°N 90.1221°W

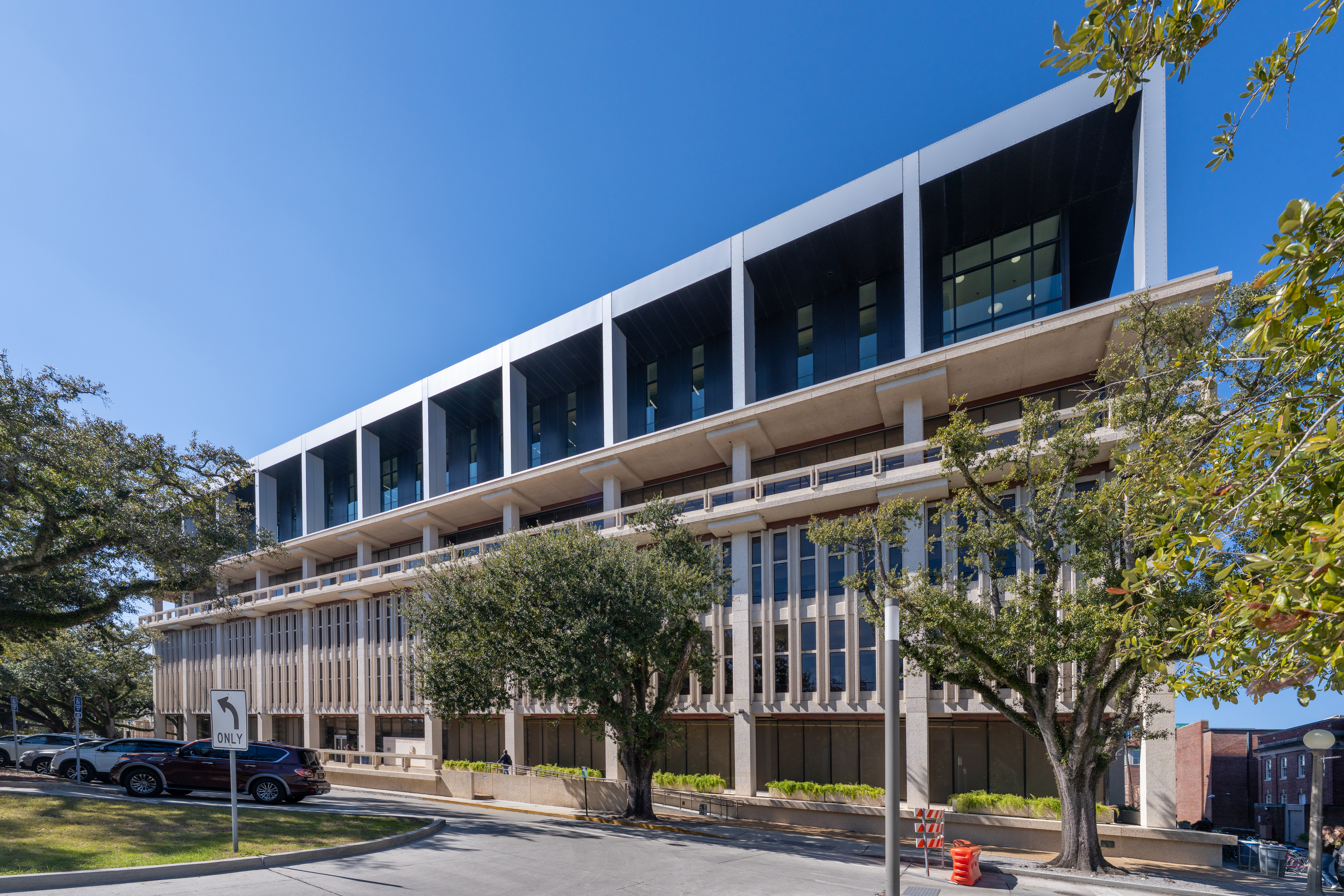
Main façade of the Howard-Tilton Memorial Library at Tulane University

Howard-Tilton Memorial Library is the university library on the uptown campus of Tulane University in New Orleans, Louisiana. A member of the Association of Research Libraries, the Howard-Tilton Memorial Library is ranked among the top 120 research libraries in North America and is a significant educational and cultural resource in the community. During Hurricane Katrina, the Library suffered extensive damage to its collections and its buildings.

== History ==
The Howard-Tilton Memorial Library was founded in 1938, when the collections of three pre-existing, smaller libraries were merged. The most significant of these early library collections was that of the F.W. Tilton Memorial Library, dedicated in 1902 in honor of New Orleans businessman and philanthropist Frederick William Tilton. The Howard Memorial Library, dating to the 19th century, was a private collection of manuscripts. The merged library was first located in Jones Hall before moving to its current, five-story building in 1968.

== Collections ==
In addition to its general collections, the Library also is home to many special collections. The library houses the Louisiana Research Collections, the William Ransom Hogan Jazz Archive, the Southeastern Architectural Archive, and University Archives. In addition, the Latin American Library at the Library contains containing rare books, manuscripts, maps, images, and rubbings of Mayan stelae, as well as a large circulating collection.

== Hurricane Katrina ==
When Hurricane Katrina struck New Orleans on August 29, 2005, the 40,000 square foot Library basement was flooded with more than eight feet of water. Four feet of water filled the basement of the library annex in Jones Hall. These areas housed the library's special collections, the Maxwell Music Library, and a very large collection of government documents. More than 700,000 print volumes and recordings, 700,000 manuscript folders and archival items, and 1.5 million individual pieces of microform were submerged.

Due to serious flooding and damage to nearby neighborhoods, the library was inaccessible to reconnaissance teams for several days. In that time, the standing water in the basement, combined with the lack of electricity (and, thus, lack of temperature control and air circulation), led to high humidity and temperature and thus the development of mold in the library at large. The disaster management company BELFOR was called to the scene as quickly as possible to begin recovery work. A temporary air circulation system run by generators was installed just 10 days after the storm and within a month, all of the water had been pumped out of the basement.

The damage from the flooding was significant. Basement walls were coated in slime and muck. Furniture and shelving had floated to the corners of the space, dislodging the materials that they once had housed, and subjecting them to submersion. The Maxwell Music Library had held more than 43,000 titles including books, scores, journals, and many rare and historic sound recordings on CD and LP. More than 70 percent of the printed books and scores were salvaged for restoration, but no recordings could be saved. The Government Documents Archive, which had held over 500,000 volumes, lost 90% of its collection. Nearly all of the salvaged government documents were trapped in storage-unit containers that had to be ripped apart to access the saturated material inside.

A very large Microforms area on the north side of the basement had held more than 30,000 titles of facsimile collections of rare or scholarly material and newspaper archives. Less than five percent of these materials could be salvaged because of the damage that lengthy immersion in dirty water can do to microforms, especially in formats such as fiche or microcard. None of the materials from the original 19th-century Howard Collection could be salvaged, due to structural wreckage and especially dangerous conditions in that area of the library.

== Recovery ==
More than 300,000 important print volumes, 18,000 reels of microfilm, and 629,711 archival items were salvaged and restored. Tulane University established the Libraries Recovery Center in 2008 to sort the restored items, check them against the library's historic catalogue, create an inventory of materials unaccounted for, and return the materials to the library's collections. In 2013, this task was still ongoing.

The Library reopened in spring 2006 for the start of the first post-Katrina semester. At that point, a battery of temporary HVAC units were being used to combat mold and humidity by distributing air throughout each floor by long semi-inflated tubes hung from the ceilings and attached through the windows along the back of the building to eight galvanized metal towers. In August 2013, plans were announced to replace these climate control systems with a more permanent solution, as well as to add a 5th and 6th floor to the library. The completion date is scheduled for Fall 2015. The basement of the Howard-Tilton Memorial Library remains gutted and empty, as does the basement level in Jones Hall.
