= October 20 =

October 20 this year in various calendars
- Tuesday, 20 October 2026
Akan	Fobene
Armenian	2 Trē 1476
Aztec	Izcalli 18, 11 Ozomahtli
Babylonian	7 Tashritu, 2337 SE
Balinese pawukon	Luang, Pepet, Pasah, Sri, Keliwon, Tungleh, Anggara of Dukut, Ludra, Urungan, Pati
Bengali	4 Kartik, BS 1433
Chinese	Yin Fire Rabbit・Tail Mansion; Fire Horse Year, Month 9, Day 11 (Hanlu, 3 days until Shuangjiang)
Common Era	20 October 2026 CE
Coptic	10 Paopi, AM 1743
Egyptian	7 Phamenoth, 2775 NE
Ethiopian	10 Ṭeqemt, 2019 Amätä Məhrät
French Republican	Décade III, Octidi de Vendémiaire de l'Année 235 de la République
Gregorian	20 October, AD 2026
Hebrew	9 Cheshvan, AM 5787
Hindu	Śravaṇa・Śūla; Solar: 3 Kārtika, 1948 SE; Lunisolar: Navamī, Śukla pakṣa of Āśvina, 2083 VE; Rāudra・5127 KY・1,872,868
Icelandic	Þriðjudagur, 27 Haustmánuður 2026
Islamic	8 Jumada al-awwal, AH 1448 (using tabular method)
ISO week date	2026-W43-2
Japanese	10 Nagatsuki, Reiwa 8 (Kanro, 3 days until Sōkō)
Julian	7 October, AD 2026 (AM 7535)
Julian day	2461334
Korean	10 Gaedal, 4359 DE
Maya	13.0.14.0.11; 4 Zac, 11 Chuen
Roman	Nonis Octobribus, MMDCCLXXIX AUC
Solar Hijri	28 Mehr, SH 1405
Tibetan	9 lhag tha skar, me pho rta 2153 or 1772 or 1000

<<	October					>>
Su	Mo	Tu	We	Th	Fr	Sa
				1	2	3
4	5	6	7	8	9	10
11	12	13	14	15	16	17
18	19	20	21	22	23	24
25	26	27	28	29	30	31
2026

October 20 in recent years
2026 (Tuesday)
2025 (Monday)
2024 (Sunday)
2023 (Friday)
2022 (Thursday)
2021 (Wednesday)
2020 (Tuesday)
2019 (Sunday)
2018 (Saturday)
2017 (Friday)

October 20 is the 293rd day of the year (294th in leap years) in the Gregorian calendar; 72 days remain until the end of the year.

== Events ==
=== Pre-1600 ===
- 1448 – The second battle of Kosovo ends when the larger army of the Ottoman Empire defeats those of the Kingdom of Hungary after the Wallachian troops desert.
- 1568 – The Spanish Duke of Alba defeats a Dutch rebel force under William the Silent.
- 1572 – Eighty Years' War: Three thousand Spanish soldiers wade through fifteen miles of water in one night to effect the relief of Goes.

=== 1601–1900 ===
- 1740 – France, Prussia, Bavaria and Saxony refuse to honour the Pragmatic Sanction, and the War of the Austrian Succession begins.
- 1774 – American Revolution: The Continental Association, a nonconsumption and nonimportation agreement against the British Isles and the British West Indies, is adopted by the First Continental Congress.
- 1781 – The Patent of Toleration, providing limited freedom of worship, is approved in Austria.
- 1803 – The United States Senate ratifies the Louisiana Purchase.
- 1818 – The Convention of 1818 is signed between the United States and the United Kingdom, which settles the Canada–United States border on the 49th parallel for most of its length.
- 1827 – Greek War of Independence: In the Battle of Navarino, a combined Turkish and Egyptian fleet is defeated by British, French and Russian naval forces in the last significant battle fought with wooden sailing ships.
- 1883 – Peru and Chile sign the Treaty of Ancón, by which the Tarapacá province is ceded to the latter, bringing an end to Peru's involvement in the War of the Pacific.

=== 1901–present ===
- 1904 – Chile and Bolivia sign the Treaty of Peace and Friendship, delimiting the border between the two countries.
- 1910 – British ocean liner RMS Olympic is launched.
- 1935 – The Long March, a mammoth retreat undertaken by the armed forces of the Chinese Communist Party a year prior, ends.
- 1941 – World War II: Thousands of civilians in German-occupied Serbia are murdered in the Kragujevac massacre.
- 1944 – World War II: The Soviet Red Army and Yugoslav Partisans liberate Belgrade.
- 1944 – Liquefied natural gas leaks from storage tanks in Cleveland and then explodes, leveling 30 blocks and killing 130 people.
- 1944 – World War II: American general Douglas MacArthur fulfills his promise to return to the Philippines when he comes ashore during the Battle of Leyte.
- 1947 – Cold War: The House Un-American Activities Committee begins its investigation into Communist infiltration of the Hollywood film industry, resulting in a blacklist that prevents some from working in the industry for years.
- 1948 – A KLM Lockheed L-049 Constellation crashes on approach to Glasgow Prestwick Airport, killing 40.
- 1951 – The "Johnny Bright incident" occurs during a football game between the Drake Bulldogs and Oklahoma A&M Aggies.
- 1952 – The Governor of Kenya Evelyn Baring declares a state of emergency and begins arresting hundreds of suspected leaders of the Mau Mau Uprising.
- 1961 – The Soviet Navy performs the first armed test of a submarine-launched ballistic missile, launching an R-13 from a Golf-class submarine.
- 1962 – China launches simultaneous offensives in Ladakh and across the McMahon Line, igniting the Sino-Indian War.
- 1973 – Watergate scandal: "Saturday Night Massacre": United States President Richard Nixon fires U.S. Attorney General Elliot Richardson and Deputy Attorney General William Ruckelshaus after they refuse to fire special prosecutor Archibald Cox, who is finally fired by Solicitor General Robert Bork.
- 1973 – The Sydney Opera House is opened by Elizabeth II after 14 years of construction.
- 1976 – The Luling–Destrehan Ferry MV George Prince is struck by the Norwegian freighter SS Frosta while crossing the Mississippi River in St. Charles Parish, Louisiana. Seventy-eight passengers and crew die, and only 18 people aboard the ferry survive.
- 1977 – A plane carrying the rock band Lynyrd Skynyrd crashes in woodland in Mississippi, United States. Six people, including three band members, are killed.
- 1981 – Two police officers and a Brink's armored car guard are killed during an armed robbery carried out by members of the Black Liberation Army and Weather Underground in Nanuet, New York.
- 1982 – During the UEFA Cup match between FC Spartak Moscow and HFC Haarlem, 66 people are crushed to death in the Luzhniki disaster.
- 1986 – Aeroflot Flight 6502 crashes while landing at Kuibyshev Airport (now Kuromoch International Airport) in Kuibyshev (now present-day Samara, Russia), killing 70 people.
- 1991 – A 6.8 M_{w} earthquake strikes the Uttarkashi region of India, killing more than 1,000 people.
- 1991 – A massive firestorm breaks out in the hills of Oakland and Berkeley, California killing 25 people and destroying more than 3,000 homes, apartments and condominiums.
- 1995 – Space Shuttle Columbia launches on STS-73.
- 2002 – Top Gear, the revived popular British TV motoring magazine, premieres on BBC.
- 2003 – The Sloan Great Wall, once the largest cosmic structures known to humanity, is discovered by students at Princeton University.
- 2005 – The general conference of the United Nations Educational, Scientific and Cultural Organization (UNESCO) passes the Convention on the Protection and Promotion of the Diversity of Cultural Expressions.
- 2011 – Libyan Crisis: Rebel forces capture Libyan dictator Muammar Gaddafi and his son Mutassim in his hometown of Sirte and kill them shortly thereafter, ending the first Libyan civil war.
- 2017 – Syrian civil war: The Syrian Democratic Forces (SDF) declare victory in the Raqqa campaign.
- 2018 – The BepiColombo spacecraft is launched on an Ariane 5 rocket to study Mercury.
- 2022 – Liz Truss steps down as British Prime Minister and leader of the Conservative Party amid the country's political crisis, serving for the least time of any British Prime Minister (49 days).

== Births ==
=== Pre-1600 ===
- 888 – Zhu Youzhen, emperor of Later Liang (died 923)
- 1475 – Giovanni di Bernardo Rucellai, Italian poet and playwright (died 1525)
- 1496 – Claude, Duke of Guise (died 1550)
- 1554 – Bálint Balassi, Hungarian writer and noble (died 1594)

=== 1601–1900 ===
- 1612 – Richard Boyle, 1st Earl of Burlington, Anglo-Irish nobleman, Lord High Treasurer of Ireland, Cavalier (died 1698)
- 1616 – Thomas Bartholin, Danish physician, mathematician, and theologian (died 1680)
- 1620 – Aelbert Cuyp, Dutch painter (died 1691)
- 1632 – Edward Hungerford, English politician (died 1711)
- 1660 – Robert Bertie, 1st Duke of Ancaster and Kesteven, English politician, Chancellor of the Duchy of Lancaster (died 1723)
- 1677 – Stanisław Leszczyński, King of Poland (died 1766)
- 1679 – Samuel von Cocceji, Prussian jurist and statesman (died 1755)
- 1711 – Timothy Ruggles, American lawyer, jurist, and politician, (died 1795)
- 1718 – Catherine Gordon, Duchess of Gordon, Scottish aristocrat (died 1779)
- 1719 – Gottfried Achenwall, German historian, economist, and jurist (died 1772)
- 1740 – Isabelle de Charrière, Dutch author and poet (died 1805)
- 1759 – Chauncey Goodrich, American lawyer and politician, 8th Lieutenant Governor of Connecticut (died 1815)
- 1780 – Pauline Bonaparte, French sister of Napoleon (died 1825)
- 1784 – Henry John Temple, 3rd Viscount Palmerston, English academic and politician, Prime Minister of the United Kingdom (died 1865)
- 1785 – George Ormerod, English historian and author (died 1873)
- 1790 – Patrick Matthew. Scottish farmer and biologist (died 1874)
- 1801 – Melchior Berri, Swiss architect and educator, designed the Natural History Museum of Basel (died 1854)
- 1808 – Karl Andree, German geographer and journalist (died 1875)
- 1819 – Báb, Iranian religious leader, founded Bábism (died 1850)
- 1822 – Thomas Hughes, English lawyer and judge (died 1896)
- 1832 – Constantin Lipsius, German architect and theorist (died 1894)
- 1847 – Frits Thaulow, Norwegian painter (died 1906)
- 1854 – Arthur Rimbaud, French soldier and poet (died 1891)
- 1858 – John Burns, English union leader and politician, President of the Board of Trade (died 1943)
- 1859 – John Dewey, American psychologist and philosopher (died 1952)
- 1864 – James F. Hinkle, American banker and politician, 6th Governor of New Mexico (died 1951)
- 1871 – Atul Prasad Sen, Indian songwriter (died 1934)
- 1873 – Nellie McClung, Canadian author and suffragist (died 1951)
- 1873 – Jussi Merinen, Finnish politician (died 1918)
- 1874 – Charles Ives, American composer (died 1954)
- 1877 – Alfred Gwynne Vanderbilt, American businessman (died 1915)
- 1879 – Hajime Kawakami, Japanese economist (died 1946)
- 1882 – Margaret Dumont, American actress (died 1965)
- 1882 – Bela Lugosi, Hungarian-American actor (died 1956)
- 1883 – Karl Probst, American engineer (died 1963)
- 1887 – Prince Yasuhiko Asaka of Japan (died 1981)
- 1889 – Johann Gruber, Austrian priest and saint (died 1944)
- 1889 – Luo Yixiu, first wife of Mao Zedong (died 1910)
- 1890 – Aleksander Maaker, Estonian bagpipe player (died 1968)
- 1891 – Samuel Flagg Bemis, American historian and author (died 1973)
- 1891 – James Chadwick, English physicist and academic, Nobel Prize laureate (died 1974)
- 1893 – Charley Chase, American actor, director, and screenwriter (died 1940)
- 1894 – Olive Thomas, American model and actress (died 1920)
- 1895 – Rex Ingram, American actor (died 1969)
- 1895 – Morrie Ryskind, American writer/director (died 1985)
- 1897 – Yi Un, South Korean general (died 1970)
- 1900 – Ismail al-Azhari, Sudanese politician, 3rd President of Sudan (died 1969)
- 1900 – Wayne Morse, American lieutenant, lawyer, and politician (died 1974)

=== 1901–present ===
- 1901 – Frank Churchill, American film composer (died 1942)
- 1901 – Adelaide Hall, American-English singer, actress, and dancer (died 1993)
- 1904 – Tommy Douglas, Scottish-Canadian minister and politician, 7th Premier of Saskatchewan (died 1986)
- 1904 – Enolia McMillan, American educator and activist (died 2006)
- 1904 – Anna Neagle, English actress, singer, and producer (died 1986)
- 1907 – Arlene Francis, American actress and television personality (died 2001)
- 1908 – Stuart Hamblen, American singer-songwriter, actor, and radio show host (died 1989)
- 1909 – Carla Laemmle, American actress and photographer (died 2014)
- 1909 – Yasushi Sugiyama, Japanese painter (died 1993)
- 1910 – Chen Liting, Chinese director and playwright (died 2013)
- 1912 – Ruhi Su, Turkish singer-songwriter (died 1985)
- 1913 – Grandpa Jones, American singer-songwriter and banjo player (died 1998)
- 1914 – Fayard Nicholas, American actor, dancer, and choreographer (died 2006)
- 1917 – Stéphane Hessel, German-French activist and diplomat (died 2013)
- 1917 – Ants Kaljurand, Estonian anti-communist, freedom fighter and forest brother (died 1951)
- 1917 – Jean-Pierre Melville, French actor, director, producer, and screenwriter (died 1973)
- 1918 – Martin Drewes, German soldier and pilot (died 2013)
- 1918 – Robert Lochner, American-German soldier and journalist (died 2003)
- 1919 – Tracy Hall, American chemist and academic (died 2008)
- 1920 – Nick Cardy, American illustrator (died 2013)
- 1920 – Fanny de Sivers, Estonian-French linguist and academic (died 2011)
- 1920 – Akhil Bandhu Ghosh, Indian singer (died 1988)
- 1920 – Janet Jagan, 6th President of Guyana (died 2009)
- 1920 – Siddhartha Shankar Ray, Indian lawyer and politician, Chief Minister of West Bengal (died 2010)
- 1921 – Manny Ayulo, American race car driver (died 1955)
- 1921 – Hans Warren, Dutch poet and author (died 2001)
- 1922 – John Anderson, American actor (died 1992)
- 1922 – Franco Ventriglia, American opera singer (died 2012)
- 1923 – Robert Craft, American conductor and musicologist (died 2015)
- 1923 – Otfried Preußler, German author (died 2013)
- 1924 – Robert Peters, American poet, playwright, and critic (died 2014)
- 1925 – András Bíró, Hungarian journalist and human rights activist (died 2024)
- 1925 – Art Buchwald, American soldier and journalist (died 2007)
- 1925 – Tom Dowd, American record producer and engineer (died 2002)
- 1925 – Roger Hanin, Algerian-French actor, director, and screenwriter (died 2015)
- 1925 – Hiromu Nonaka, Japanese politician (died 2018)
- 1926 – Edward Douglas-Scott-Montagu, 3rd Baron Montagu of Beaulieu, English lieutenant and politician, founded the National Motor Museum (died 2015)
- 1927 – Joyce Brothers, American psychologist, author, and actress (died 2013)
- 1927 – Gunturu Seshendra Sarma, Indian poet and critic (died 2007)
- 1928 – Michael O'Donnell, English physician, author, and journalist (died 2019)
- 1931 – Richard Caliguiri, American lawyer and politician, 54th Mayor of Pittsburgh (died 1988)
- 1931 – Mickey Mantle, American baseball player and sportscaster (died 1995)
- 1931 – Ken Morrison, English businessman (died 2017)
- 1931 – Park Wan-suh, South Korean writer (died 2011)
- 1932 – Rosey Brown, American football player and coach (died 2004)
- 1932 – William Christopher, American actor and singer (died 2016)
- 1932 – Rokurō Naya, Japanese voice actor (died 2014)
- 1933 – Barrie Chase, American actress and dancer
- 1934 – Bill Chase, American trumpet player (died 1974)
- 1934 – Eddie Harris, American saxophonist (died 1996)
- 1934 – Timothy West, English actor (died 2024)
- 1935 – Jerry Orbach, American actor and singer (died 2004)
- 1937 – Cancio Garcia, Filipino lawyer and jurist (died 2013)
- 1937 – Wanda Jackson, American singer-songwriter and guitarist
- 1937 – Juan Marichal, Dominican baseball player and sportscaster
- 1937 – Emma Tennant, English author (died 2017)
- 1938 – Emidio Greco, Italian director and screenwriter (died 2012)
- 1938 – Dolores Hart, American actress and nun
- 1938 – Iain Macmillan, Scottish photographer and educator (died 2006)
- 1939 – Patrick Hughes, English painter, illustrator, and photographer
- 1940 – Jean-Pierre Dikongué Pipa, Cameroonian filmmaker
- 1940 – Kathy Kirby, English singer (died 2011)
- 1940 – Robert Pinsky, American poet and critic
- 1941 – Anneke Wills, English actress
- 1942 – Earl Hindman, American actor (died 2003)
- 1942 – Christiane Nüsslein-Volhard, German biologist and geneticist, Nobel Prize laureate
- 1942 – Bart Zoet, Dutch cyclist (died 1992)
- 1943 – Dunja Vejzović, Croatian soprano and actress
- 1944 – Nalin de Silva, Sri Lankan physicist and philosopher (died 2024)
- 1944 – David Mancuso, American party planner, created The Loft (died 2016)
- 1945 – Ric Lee, English drummer
- 1946 – Diana Gittins, American-English sociologist, author, and academic
- 1946 – Lewis Grizzard, American comedian and author (died 1994)
- 1946 – Elfriede Jelinek, Austrian author and playwright, Nobel Prize laureate
- 1946 – Richard Loncraine, English director and screenwriter
- 1946 – Lucien Van Impe, Belgian cyclist
- 1946 – Chris Woodhead, English civil servant and academic (died 2015)
- 1948 – Peter Combe, Australian entertainer
- 1948 – Sandra Dickinson, American-English actress and composer
- 1948 – Piet Hein Donner, Dutch jurist and politician, Dutch Minister of Justice
- 1948 – Melih Gökçek, Turkish journalist and politician, Mayor of Ankara
- 1949 – Valeriy Borzov, Ukrainian-Russian sprinter
- 1950 – Chris Cannon, American politician (died 2024)
- 1950 – Tom Petty, American singer-songwriter, guitarist, and producer (died 2017)
- 1950 – William Russ, American actor and director
- 1951 – Al Greenwood, American keyboard player
- 1951 – Patrick Hall, English lawyer and politician
- 1951 – Ken Ham, Australian-American evangelist
- 1951 – Leif Pagrotsky, Swedish businessman and politician
- 1951 – Claudio Ranieri, Italian footballer and manager
- 1952 – Melanie Mayron, American actress and director
- 1952 – Derek Ridgers, English photographer and art director
- 1952 – Wilma Salgado, Ecuadorian politician and economist
- 1953 – Keith Hernandez, American baseball player and sportscaster
- 1953 – Richard McWilliam, American businessman and philanthropist, co-founded the Upper Deck Company (died 2013)
- 1953 – Bill Nunn, American actor (died 2016)
- 1954 – Steve Orich, American composer and conductor
- 1955 – Thomas Newman, American composer and conductor
- 1955 – David Profumo, English author and academic
- 1955 – Aaron Pryor, American boxer (died 2016)
- 1955 – Sheldon Whitehouse, American politician
- 1956 – Danny Boyle, English director, producer, and screenwriter
- 1956 – Martin Taylor, English guitarist
- 1957 – Jane Bonham-Carter, Baroness Bonham-Carter of Yarnbury, English politician
- 1957 – Chris Cowdrey, English cricketer and sportscaster
- 1957 – Chalermchai Sitthisart, Thai military officer, 40th Commander-in-chief of the Royal Thai Army
- 1957 – Hilda Solis, American academic and politician, 25th United States Secretary of Labor
- 1958 – Valerie Faris, American director and producer
- 1958 – Lynn Flewelling, American author and academic
- 1958 – Scott Hall, American wrestler (died 2022)
- 1958 – Mark King, English singer-songwriter and bass player
- 1958 – Dave Krieg, American football player
- 1958 – Viggo Mortensen, American-Danish actor and producer
- 1959 – Mark Little, Australian comedian, actor, and screenwriter
- 1961 – Audun Kleive, Norwegian drummer and composer
- 1961 – Kate Mosse, English author and playwright
- 1961 – Ian Rush, Welsh footballer and manager
- 1961 – Les Stroud, Canadian director, producer, and harmonica player
- 1961 – Michie Tomizawa, Japanese voice actress and singer
- 1962 – Dave Wong, Hong Kong-Taiwanese singer-songwriter and actor
- 1963 – Julie Payette, Canadian engineer, astronaut, and 29th Governor General of Canada
- 1964 – Kamala Harris, American politician and lawyer, 49th Vice President of the United States
- 1965 – Norman Blake, Scottish singer-songwriter and guitarist
- 1965 – Jonathan I. Schwartz, American businessman
- 1965 – Mikhail Shtalenkov, Russian ice hockey player
- 1965 – William Zabka, American actor and producer
- 1966 – Allan Donald, South African cricketer and coach
- 1966 – Patrick Volkerding, American computer scientist and engineer, founded Slackware
- 1967 – Artur Grigorian, Armenian-Uzbek boxer
- 1967 – Kerrod Walters, Australian rugby league player
- 1967 – Kevin Walters, Australian rugby league player and coach
- 1968 – Susan Tully, English actress, director, and producer
- 1969 – Laurie Daley, Australian rugby league player and coach
- 1969 – Juan González, Puerto Rican baseball player
- 1970 – Neil Heywood, English-Chinese businessman (died 2011)
- 1970 – Aapo Ilves, Estonian poet and illustrator
- 1970 – Michelle Malkin, American blogger and author
- 1970 – Taj McWilliams-Franklin, American basketball player
- 1971 – Kenneth Choi, American actor
- 1971 – Snoop Dogg, American rapper, producer, and actor
- 1971 – Eddie Jones, American basketball player
- 1971 – Kamiel Maase, Dutch runner
- 1971 – Dannii Minogue, Australian singer-songwriter and actress
- 1972 – Will Greenwood, English rugby player and sportscaster
- 1972 – Brian Schatz, American academic and politician, 11th Lieutenant Governor of Hawaii
- 1974 – Ed Hale, American singer-songwriter, writer and socio-political activist
- 1974 – Limmy, Scottish comedian and writer
- 1974 – Bashar Rahal, Emirati-American actor and producer
- 1975 – Ronny Aukrust, Norwegian politician
- 1976 – Dan Fogler, American actor, director, producer, and screenwriter
- 1976 – Nicola Legrottaglie, Italian footballer and manager
- 1977 – Hun Manet, Cambodian politician and military officer, 33rd Prime Minister of Cambodia
- 1977 – Leila Josefowicz, Canadian-American violinist
- 1977 – Sam Witwer, American actor and musician
- 1978 – Virender Sehwag, Indian cricketer
- 1978 – Paul Wilson, Scottish bass player and songwriter
- 1979 – Paul Ifill, English footballer
- 1979 – John Krasinski, American actor, director, and producer
- 1979 – Paul O'Connell, Irish rugby player
- 1981 – Dimitrios Papadopoulos, Greek footballer
- 1982 – Preeti Barameeanant, Thai singer
- 1982 – Becky Brewerton, Welsh golfer
- 1982 – Lawrence Roberts, American basketball player
- 1983 – Alona Tal, Israeli actress
- 1983 – Michel Vorm, Dutch footballer
- 1984 – Mitch Lucker, American singer-songwriter (died 2012)
- 1984 – Andrew Trimble, Irish rugby player
- 1985 – James Sutton, English race car driver
- 1986 – Elyse Taylor, Australian model
- 1987 – Marie Sophie Hingst, German historian and blogger who falsely claimed to be descended from Holocaust survivors (died 2019)
- 1988 – ASAP Ferg, American rapper
- 1988 – Rui Pinto, Portuguese activist and whistleblower
- 1988 – Candice Swanepoel, South African supermodel and philanthropist
- 1989 – Jamie Collins, American football player
- 1989 – Jess Glynne, English singer-songwriter
- 1990 – Sam Mataora, Cook Islands rugby league player
- 1991 – Phupoom Pongpanupak, Thai actor
- 1992 – Mattia De Sciglio, Italian footballer
- 1992 – Ksenia Semyonova, Russian gymnast
- 1992 – Kyle Wiltjer, Canadian-American basketball player
- 1994 – Festus Talam, Kenyan long-distance runner
- 1995 – Humberto Carrillo, Mexican wrestler
- 1996 – Anthony Sinisuka Ginting, Indonesian badminton player
- 1997 – Ademola Lookman, Nigerian footballer
- 1997 – Daizen Maeda, Japanese footballer
- 1997 – Nguyễn Tiến Linh, Vietnamese footballer
- 1997 – Andrey Rublev, Russian tennis player
- 1998 – Jordan Ridley, Australian rules footballer
- 1999 – Chuu, South Korean singer and television personality
- 1999 – YoungBoy Never Broke Again, American rapper
- 2000 – Kenneth Walker III, American football player
- 2001 – Paige Bueckers, American basketball player
- 2002 – Yéremy Pino, Spanish footballer
- 2003 – Carney Chukwuemeka, English footballer

== Deaths ==
=== Pre-1600 ===
- 460 – Aelia Eudocia, Byzantine wife of Theodosius II (born 401)
- 967 – Li Yixing, Chinese governor
- 1122 – Ralph d'Escures, archbishop of Canterbury
- 1139 – Henry X, Duke of Bavaria (born 1108)
- 1187 – Pope Urban III
- 1327 – Teresa d'Entença, Countess of Urgell (born 1300)
- 1401 – Klaus Störtebeker, German pirate
- 1423 – Henry Bowet, Archbishop of York
- 1438 – Jacopo della Quercia, Sienese sculptor (born c. 1374)
- 1439 – Ambrose the Camaldulian, Italian theologian
- 1524 – Thomas Linacre, English physician and scholar (born 1460)
- 1538 – Francesco Maria I della Rovere, Duke of Urbino, condottiero (born 1490)
- 1570 – João de Barros, Portuguese historian and author (born 1496)

=== 1601–1900 ===
- 1602 – Walter Leveson, Elizabethan member of parliament, Shropshire landowner (born 1550)
- 1640 – John Ball, English clergyman and theologian (born 1585)
- 1652 – Antonio Coello, Spanish poet and playwright (born 1611)
- 1713 – Archibald Pitcairne, Scottish physician and academic (born 1652)
- 1740 – Charles VI, Holy Roman Emperor (born 1685)
- 1865 – Champ Ferguson, American guerrilla leader (born 1821)
- 1870 – Michael William Balfe, Irish violinist and composer (born 1808)
- 1871 – Karl Christian Ulmann, Latvian-German theologian and academic (born 1793)
- 1880 – Lydia Maria Child, American journalist, author, and activist (born 1802)
- 1883 – George Chichester, 3rd Marquess of Donegall (born 1797)
- 1890 – Richard Francis Burton, English-Italian geographer and explorer (born 1821)
- 1894 – James Anthony Froude, English historian, novelist, biographer and editor (born 1818)
- 1900 – Naim Frashëri, Albanian poet and translator (born 1846)

=== 1901–present ===
- 1908 – Vaiben Louis Solomon, Australian politician, 21st Premier of South Australia (born 1853)
- 1910 – David B. Hill, American lawyer and politician, 29th Governor of New York (born 1843)
- 1919 – Saovabha Phongsri, Queen Consort of King Chulalongkorn of Siam (born 1864)
- 1922 – Maria Bertilla Boscardin, Italian Catholic saint (born 1888)
- 1926 – Eugene V. Debs, American union leader and politician (born 1855)
- 1928 – Jack Peddie, Scottish footballer (born 1876)
- 1935 – Arthur Henderson, Scottish-English politician, Secretary of State for Foreign Affairs, Nobel Prize laureate (born 1863)
- 1936 – Anne Sullivan, American educator (born 1866)
- 1940 – Gunnar Asplund, Swedish architect and academic, co-designed Skogskyrkogården (born 1885)
- 1941 – Ken Farnes, English cricketer and soldier (born 1911)
- 1950 – Henry L. Stimson, American colonel, lawyer, and politician, 46th United States Secretary of State (born 1867)
- 1953 – Werner Baumbach, German colonel and pilot (born 1916)
- 1956 – Lawrence Dale Bell, American industrialist and founder of Bell Aircraft Corporation (born 1894)
- 1957 – Michalis Dorizas, Greek-American javelin thrower and football player (born 1890)
- 1957 – Edward B. Greene, American banking, mining, and steel company executive (born 1878)
- 1964 – Herbert Hoover, American engineer and politician, 31st President of the United States (born 1874)
- 1967 – Shigeru Yoshida, Japanese politician and diplomat, 32nd Prime Minister of Japan (born 1878)
- 1968 – Bud Flanagan, English actor and screenwriter (born 1896)
- 1972 – Harlow Shapley, American astronomer and academic (born 1885)
- 1973 – Norman Chandler, American newspaper executive (born 1899)
- 1977 – Steve Gaines, American guitarist (born 1949)
- 1977 – Ronnie Van Zant, American singer-songwriter (born 1948)
- 1978 – Gunnar Nilsson, Swedish race car driver (born 1948)
- 1983 – Yves Thériault, Canadian author (born 1915)
- 1983 – Merle Travis, American singer-songwriter and guitarist (born 1917)
- 1984 – Carl Ferdinand Cori, Czech-American biochemist and pharmacologist, Nobel Prize laureate (born 1896)
- 1984 – Paul Dirac, English-American physicist and mathematician, Nobel Prize laureate (born 1902)
- 1987 – Andrey Kolmogorov, Russian mathematician and academic (born 1903)
- 1988 – Sheila Scott, English pilot and author (born 1922)
- 1989 – Anthony Quayle, English actor and director (born 1913)
- 1990 – Joel McCrea, American actor (born 1905)
- 1992 – Werner Torkanowsky, German-American conductor (born 1926)
- 1993 – Yasushi Sugiyama, Japanese painter (born 1909)
- 1994 – Sergei Bondarchuk, Russian actor and filmmaker (born 1920)
- 1994 – Burt Lancaster, American actor (born 1913)
- 1995 – Christopher Stone, American actor, director, and screenwriter (born 1942)
- 1995 – John Tonkin, Australian politician, 20th Premier of Western Australia (born 1902)
- 1999 – Calvin Griffith, Canadian-American businessman (born 1911)
- 1999 – Jack Lynch, Irish footballer, lawyer, and politician, 5th Taoiseach of Ireland (born 1917)
- 2001 – Ted Ammon, American financier and banker (born 1949)
- 2003 – Jack Elam, American actor (born 1918)
- 2004 – Anthony Hecht, American poet and educator (born 1923)
- 2004 – Chuck Hiller, American baseball player, coach, and manager (born 1934)
- 2005 – Shirley Horn, American singer and pianist (born 1934)
- 2005 – Eva Švankmajerová, Czech painter and poet (born 1940)
- 2005 – André van der Louw, Dutch lawyer and politician, 16th Mayor of Rotterdam (born 1933)
- 2006 – Arnold Viiding, Estonian shot putter and discus thrower (born 1911)
- 2006 – Jane Wyatt, American actress (born 1910)
- 2007 – Max McGee, American football player and sportscaster (born 1932)
- 2008 – Gene Hickerson, American football player (born 1935)
- 2010 – W. Cary Edwards, American politician (born 1944)
- 2010 – Bob Guccione, American publisher, founded Penthouse magazine (born 1930)
- 2010 – Eva Ibbotson, Austrian-English author (born 1925)
- 2010 – Max Kohnstamm, Dutch historian and diplomat (born 1914)
- 2010 – Farooq Leghari, Pakistani politician, 8th President of Pakistan (born 1940)
- 2011 – Muammar Gaddafi, Libyan colonel and politician, Prime Minister of Libya (born 1942)
- 2011 – Mutassim Gaddafi, Libyan colonel (born 1974)
- 2011 – Abu-Bakr Yunis Jabr, Libyan politician (born 1942)
- 2011 – Iztok Puc, Croatian-Slovenian handball player (born 1966)
- 2012 – Przemysław Gintrowski, Polish poet and composer (born 1951)
- 2012 – Paul Kurtz, American philosopher and academic (born 1925)
- 2012 – Dave May, American baseball player (born 1943)
- 2012 – John McConnell, American activist, created Earth Day (born 1915)
- 2012 – E. Donnall Thomas, American physician and academic, Nobel Prize laureate (born 1920)
- 2012 – Raymond Watson, American businessman (born 1926)
- 2013 – Jovanka Broz, Croatian-Serbian colonel (born 1924)
- 2013 – Don James, American football player and coach (born 1932)
- 2013 – Lawrence Klein, American economist and academic, Nobel Prize laureate (born 1920)
- 2013 – Joginder Singh, Kenyan race car driver (born 1932)
- 2013 – Larri Thomas, American actress and dancer (born 1932)
- 2013 – Sid Yudain, American journalist, founded Roll Call (born 1923)
- 2014 – René Burri, Swiss photographer and journalist (born 1933)
- 2014 – Oscar de la Renta, Dominican-American fashion designer (born 1932)
- 2014 – Christophe de Margerie, French businessman (born 1951)
- 2015 – Makis Dendrinos, Greek basketball player and coach (born 1950)
- 2015 – Arno Gruen, German-Swiss psychologist and psychoanalyst (born 1923)
- 2015 – Kazimierz Łaski, Polish-Austrian economist and academic (born 1921)
- 2015 – Michael Meacher, English academic and politician, Secretary of State for the Environment, Transport and the Regions (born 1939)
- 2015 – Ian Steel, Scottish cyclist and manager (born 1928)
- 2016 – Kaneta Kimotsuki, Japanese actor, voice actor, and theater director (born 1935)
- 2016 – Robert E. Kramek, former United States Coast Guard admiral (born 1939)
- 2016 – Michael Massee, American actor (born 1952)
- 2016 – Junko Tabei, Japanese mountaineer (born 1939)
- 2018 – Wim Kok, Dutch prime minister (born 1938)
- 2020 – James Randi, Canadian-American stage magician and author (born 1928)
- 2022 – Lucy Simon, American composer and songwriter (born 1940)
- 2024 – Barbara Dane, American folk, blues and jazz singer (born 1927)
- 2024 – Fethullah Gülen, Turkish preacher and theologian (born 1941)
- 2024 – Walter Jacob, American Reform rabbi (born 1930)
- 2024 – Janusz Olejniczak, Polish classical pianist and actor (born 1952)
- 2024 – Paul White, Baron Hanningfield, British life peer (born 1940)
- 2026 – Manuel Otto, German video game developer (born 1996)

== Holidays and observances ==
- Christian feast days:
  - Acca of Hexham
  - Aderald
  - Artemius
  - Caprasius of Agen
  - Blessed Franz Alexander Kern
  - Irene of Tomar
  - Jakub Strzemię
  - Magdalene of Nagasaki
  - Paul of the Cross (in USA, moved from Oct. 19)
  - Maria Bertilla Boscardin
  - Mater Admirabilis
  - October 20 (Eastern Orthodox liturgics)
- Arbor Day (Czech Republic)
- Heroes' Day (Kenya)
- Revolution Day (Guatemala), one of the two Patriotic Days (Guatemala)
- Vietnamese Women's Day (Vietnam)
- World Osteoporosis Day
- World Statistics Day
