= List of shipwrecks in 1976 =

The list of shipwrecks in 1976 includes ships sunk, foundered, grounded, or otherwise lost during 1976.

table of contents
1976
Jan	Feb	Mar	Apr
May	Jun	Jul	Aug
Sep	Oct	Nov	Dec
Unknown date

== January ==
=== 3 January ===
List of shipwrecks: 3 January 1976
Ship	State	Description
Capella	East Germany	The coaster sank off Schiermonnikoog, the Netherlands.
Carnoustie	United Kingdom	Sank in same storm as Capella. Often mistakenly referred to as "Carnoesti" in American press.

=== 8 January ===
List of shipwrecks: 8 January 1976
Ship	State	Description
Princess Sissy	Panama	The cruise ship ran aground in the Adriatic between the islands of Hvar and Korčula.
Vanquisher	United Kingdom	The tug capsized and sank in the Thames Estuary at Tilbury whilst assisting Jervis Bay (United Kingdom). All seven crew rescued.

=== 10 January ===
List of shipwrecks: 10 January 1976
Ship	State	Description
ARA Comandante General Zapiola	Argentine Navy	The Navajo-class fleet ocean tug ran aground on a reef off Antarctica and was declared a total loss.

=== 14 January ===
List of shipwrecks: 14 January 1976
Ship	State	Description
Wyre Victory	United Kingdom	The 140.1-foot (42.7 m), 398-ton trawler grounded on submerged rocks at Mill Rocks, southwest of Oigh Sgeir Lighthouse, west of the Isle of Rhum, Inner Hebrides. She floated off 45 minutes later and sank. Her crew was rescued by Wyre Conqueror (United Kingdom).

=== 19 January ===
List of shipwrecks: 19 January 1976
Ship	State	Description
Esso Provence	France	The tanker ran aground off Fawley, Hampshire, United Kingdom.

=== 26 January ===
List of shipwrecks: 26 January 1976
Ship	State	Description
Olympic Bravery	Greece	The tanker ran aground off the coast of Brittany, France.

=== 28 January ===
List of shipwrecks: 28 January 1976
Ship	State	Description
Conrad Weiser	United States	The Liberty ship was scuttled off Port Mansfield, Texas.

=== Unknown date ===
List of shipwrecks: Unknown date 1976
Ship	State	Description
Kirk Pride	Cayman Islands	The vessel struck a reef and sank off the Cayman Islands.

== February ==
=== 11 February ===
List of shipwrecks: 11 February 1976
Ship	State	Description
Evgenia I	Greece	The ship ran aground 23 nautical miles (43 km) north of Jeddah, Saudi Arabia and was severely damaged. She was refloated but had to be beached. Declared a constructive total loss.

=== 13 February ===
List of shipwrecks: 13 February 1976
Ship	State	Description
Oriental Ace	Liberia	The Victory ship sprang a leak and sank in the Pacific Ocean (32°05′N 152°43′E).

=== 15 February ===
List of shipwrecks: 15 February 1976
Ship	State	Description
USS Otterstetter	United States Navy	The Edsall-class destroyer escort was sunk as target off Puerto Rico.

=== 20 February ===
List of shipwrecks: 20 February 1976
Ship	State	Description
Marie Elizabeth	Panama	The cargo ship caught fire at Barcelona, Spain and was abandoned by her crew. Declared a total loss.

=== 22 February ===
List of shipwrecks: 22 February 1976
Ship	State	Description
Unknown	Khmer Rouge	A navy vessel was sunk by six Thai navy vessels.

=== 26 February ===
List of shipwrecks: 26 February 1976
Ship	State	Description
Gustave Zédé	French Navy	The decommissioned submarine tender was sunk as a target in 2,149 metres (7,051 ft) of water in the Mediterranean Sea south of Marseille, France, at 42°30′N 5°24′E by an E14 torpedo fired by the submarine Doris (French Navy).

== March ==
=== 1 March ===
List of shipwrecks: 1 March 1976
Ship	State	Description
Deep Sea Driller	Norway	The drilling rig ran aground off Bergen. One leg broke off and six crew were killed. Although declared a constructive total loss, the rig was later repaired and returned to service.

=== 4 March ===
List of shipwrecks: 4 March 1969
Ship	State	Description
USS Magnet	United States Navy	The decommissioned degaussing vessel was sunk as a target in the Pacific Ocean off the coast of Baja California at 31°16′N 117°40′W.

=== 19 March ===
List of shipwrecks: 19 March 1969
Ship	State	Description
James E. Haviland	United States	The Liberty ship was scuttled off the Virginia Capes.

=== 23 March ===
List of shipwrecks: 23 March 1969
Ship	State	Description
INS Godavari	Indian Navy	The Hunt-class destroyer ran aground in the Maldives and was damaged beyond repair.

=== Unknown date ===
List of shipwrecks: Unknown date in March 1969
Ship	State	Description
Charles A. Dana	United States	The Liberty ship was scuttled off Aransas Pass, Texas.

== April ==
=== 5 April ===
List of shipwrecks: 5 April 1976
Ship	State	Description
Kitty Bear	United States	The 12-gross register ton, 34.2-foot (10.4 m) fishing vessel sank in Clarence Strait in the Alexander Archipelago in Southeast Alaska.

=== 6 April ===
List of shipwrecks: 6 April 1976
Ship	State	Description
Ferro 119	Cuba	The fishing boat was sunk by a Cuban exile-operated boat, with one crewman killed and three wounded aboard her and Ferro 123 (Cuba) combined.
Ferro 123	Cuba	The fishing boat was sunk by a Cuban exile-operated boat, with one crewman killed and three wounded aboard her and Ferro 119 (Cuba) combined .

=== 8 April ===
List of shipwrecks: 8 April 1976
Ship	State	Description
Kaptanvassos	Cyprus	The cargo ship capsized and sank off Perama, Greece. Five of her crew were lost.

=== 14 April ===
List of shipwrecks: 14 April 1976
Ship	State	Description
SAS Vrystaat	South African Navy	The decommissioned Type 15 frigate was sunk as a torpedo target by the submarine SAS Maria van Riebeeck (South African Navy) eight nautical miles (15 km; 9.2 mi) southwest of Cape Point. South Africa.

=== 16 April ===
List of shipwrecks: 16 April 1976
Ship	State	Description
Ocean Express	United States	The drilling rig sank in the Gulf of Mexico. Thirteen of her 36 crew were killed when an escape capsule capsized and sank.

=== 25 April ===
List of shipwrecks: 25 April 1976
Ship	State	Description
George Dewey	United States	The Liberty ship was scuttled off Port Mansfield, Texas.
Rachel Jackson	United States	The Liberty ship was scuttled off Port Mansfield.

=== 26 April ===
List of shipwrecks: 26 April 1976
Ship	State	Description
Master Carl	United States	The 131-gross register ton, 72.7-foot (22.2 m) crab-fishing vessel capsized and sank in a storm in the Gulf of Alaska off the south-central coast of Alaska near Kayak Island, approximately 6 nautical miles (11 km; 6.9 mi) southeast of Cape Suckling (59°59′30″N 143°53′00″W). Her entire crew of four abandoned ship in a life raft, but two of them died when the raft capsized in the surf as they approached the shore. The other two crew members survived.

=== 30 April ===
List of shipwrecks: 30 April 1976
Ship	State	Description
Abraham Baldwin	United States	The Liberty ship was scuttled as and artificial reef off Horn Island, Mississippi.

== May ==
=== 2 May ===
List of shipwrecks: 2 May 1976
Ship	State	Description
Nordhuk	West Germany	The cargo ship ran aground off Eilean Trodday, Inner Hebrides, United Kingdom and was wrecked. All twelve crew were rescued by the Stornoway Lifeboat.

=== 12 May ===
List of shipwrecks: 12 May 1976
Ship	State	Description
Hotai	United States	The 81-gross register ton, 86-foot (26.2 m) motor vessel was wrecked on the coast of Montague Island on the south-central coast of Alaska.
Urquiola	Spain	The tanker exploded and caught fire at the mouth of A Coruña harbour, killing two of her thirty-nine crew.

=== 13 May ===
List of shipwrecks: 13 May 1976
Ship	State	Description
Christmas Seal	Canada	The motor vessel ran aground at Eastern Shore, Nova Scotia, Canada, and sank.

=== 21 May ===
List of shipwrecks: 21 May 1976
Ship	State	Description
James Caldwell	United States	The Liberty ship was scuttled off Horn Island, Mississippi.

== June ==
=== 10 June ===
List of shipwrecks: 10 June 1976
Ship	State	Description
Gamtoos	South Africa	The cargo ship was sunk as a target in Table Bay off the coast of South Africa by South African Air Force aircraft.

=== 15 June ===
List of shipwrecks: 15 June 1976
Ship	State	Description
André Monique	Belgium	The fire-damaged André Monique. The fishing trawler was damaged by fire off the coast of Denmark.

=== 23 June ===
List of shipwrecks: 6 June 1976
Ship	State	Description
Armorique	France	The ferry ran aground off Saint-Malo, Ille-et-Vilaine and was damaged. She was later repaired and returned to service.

=== 23 June ===
List of shipwrecks: 23 June 1976
Ship	State	Description
NEPCO 140	United States	The barge ran aground in the American Narrows causing a large oil spill.

=== Unknown date ===
List of shipwrecks: Unknown date in June 1976
Ship	State	Description
B. F. Shaw	United States	The Liberty ship was scuttled off Freeport, Texas.
Lappe	United Kingdom	The lighter sank in Cline Bay, off Freetown, Sierra Leone.

== July ==
=== 3 July ===
List of shipwrecks: 3 July 1976
Ship	State	Description
Polaris 1	Panama	The tanker was driven ashore on San Andrés Island, Columbia. Consequently scrapped in 1977.

=== 15 July ===
List of shipwrecks: 15 July 1976
Ship	State	Description
Adham	Syria	The 399-ton ship sank off Egypt.

=== 21 July ===
List of shipwrecks: 21 July 1976
Ship	State	Description
USS Chopper	United States Navy	Tethered for use as a target by the submarine USS Spadefish (United States Navy), the decommissioned Balao-class submarine sank in the Atlantic Ocean off Cape Hatteras, North Carolina, before Spadefish could fire at her.

=== 25 July ===
List of shipwrecks: 25 July 1976
Ship	State	Description
Duck	United States	The houseboat struck a submerged log and sank in the Inside Passage in Southeast Alaska at a location described in the wreck report as "Saint Mary's Point" north of Ketchikan, Alaska, possibly a misidentification of Point Saint Mary's (58°44′00″N 135°01′15″W) north of Juneau, Alaska.
Miller’s Bay	United States	The 34-foot (10.4 m) salmon troller disappeared with the loss of all three people on board – a husband and wife and their 14-year-old daughter – while fishing off Noyes Island in the Alexander Archipelago in Southeast Alaska.

=== Unknown date ===
List of shipwrecks: Unknown date in July 1976
Ship	State	Description
Gulf Coast	Cyprus	The coaster caught fire in the English Channel and was beached.

== August ==
=== 3 August ===
List of shipwrecks: 3 August 1976
Ship	State	Description
Ann Page	United States	The fishing vessel sank south of Wingham Island (60°01′N 144°23′W) near Cordova, Alaska, after she struck a rock.

=== 10 August ===
List of shipwrecks: 10 August 1976
Ship	State	Description
HMS Reward	Royal Navy	The offshore patrol vessel collided with Plainsman (Singapore) in the Firth of Forth during foggy weather and sank. All 42 people on board rescued by Plainsman.

=== 12 August ===
List of shipwrecks: 12 August 1976
Ship	State	Description
Major	United States	The 50-gross register ton, 54.8-foot (16.7 m) fishing vessel sank off Kodiak Island, Alaska.

=== 16 August ===
List of shipwrecks: 16 August 1976
Ship	State	Description
Barkis	United Kingdom	The tug capsized and sank off Lowestoft, Suffolk with the loss of one of her four crew.

=== 20 August ===
List of shipwrecks: 20 August 1976
Ship	State	Description
Morning Cloud	United Kingdom	The yacht ran aground outside Ramsgate Harbour, Kent.

=== 24 August ===
List of shipwrecks: 24 August 1976
Ship	State	Description
Malaysia Raya	Malaysia	The cruise ship caught fire at Kuala Lumpur, a total loss.

=== 26 August ===
List of shipwrecks: 26 August 1976
Ship	State	Description
Deep Sea	United States	During a voyage in Alaska′s Kodiak Archipelago from Mush Bay (57.7°N 153.47333333°W) to Kodiak, the 72-foot (21.9 m) fishing tender sank in Whale Pass between Kodiak Island and Whale Island during a gale with the loss of all eight people – three men, three women, a 5-year-old boy, and a 20-month-old girl – aboard.

=== 31 August ===
List of shipwrecks: 31 August 1976
Ship	State	Description
TCG Dumlupınar	Turkish Navy	The Balao-class submarine was beached in the Dardanelles to avoid sinking after colliding with the cargo ship Szik Vovilov (Soviet Union). She later was salvaged, repaired, and returned to service.

=== Unknown date ===
List of shipwrecks: Unknown August
Ship	State	Description
Tina	Greece	Lebanese Civil War: The vessel was sunk by limpet mines in Lebanon by the Christian faction sometime in August.

== September ==
=== 17 September ===
List of shipwrecks: 17 September 1976
Ship	State	Description
Salinda	Panama	The Design 381 coastal freighter capsized and sank off Uwi Island.

=== 18 September ===
List of shipwrecks: 18 September 1976
Ship	State	Description
Alexandra K.	Greece	The cargo ship caught fire in the Aegean Sea (35°10′N 30°20′E) and was abandoned. She was on a voyage from Eleusis to Jeddah, Saudi Arabia. Presumed to have subsequently sunk.
Richard Upjohn	United States	The Liberty ship was scuttled off Horn Island, Mississppi.

=== 20 September ===
List of shipwrecks: 20 September 1976
Ship	State	Description
HMS Fittleton	Royal Navy	The minesweeper capsized within a minute of colliding with the frigate HMS Mermaid (Royal Navy) in the North Sea 60 nautical miles (110 km; 69 mi) north of the island of Texel, the Netherlands. She sank several hours later in 160 feet (49 m) of water. Twelve members of her crew lost their lives; accompanying ships rescued 32 survivors. She was brought to the surface the next day and scrapped in 1977.

=== 23 September ===
List of shipwrecks: 23 September 1976
Ship	State	Description
William H. Allen	United States	The Liberty ship was scuttled off Freeport, Texas.

=== 22 September ===
List of shipwrecks: 22 September 1976
Ship	State	Description
Tiger Lil	United States	The 38-foot (11.6 m) sailboat and all three people aboard her disappeared in the Gulf of Alaska during a voyage from Seward, Alaska, to Seattle, Washington. Later, wreckage of Tiger Lil later was found on Montague Island at the entrance to Prince William Sound and the body of one of her occupants washed ashore on Kayak Island.

=== 26 September ===
List of shipwrecks: 26 September 1976
Ship	State	Description
Gertrude S	United States	The 70-foot (21.3 m) vessel sank in 342 feet (104 m) of water in Kupreanof Strait (57°58′N 153°00′W) between Raspberry Island and Kodiak Island in Alaska′s Kodiak Archipelago. The fishing vessel Sierra Seas (United States) rescued her crew.

=== 27 September ===
List of shipwrecks: 27 September 1976
Ship	State	Description
Miss Aurora	United States	The 22-gross register ton motor vessel sank in Chatham Strait in the Alexander Archipelago in Southeast Alaska, 1.5 nautical miles (2.8 km; 1.7 mi) off Point Lull (57°18′00″N 134°48′45″W) at the entrance to Kelp Bay (57.2982°N 134.8658°W).

=== 29 September ===
List of shipwrecks: 29 September 1976
Ship	State	Description
Rarau	Poland	The 2,186-ton factory trawler with a Romanian crew of eighty-four drove into the northern part of the Seven Stones Reef known as the North-east Rocks. All the crew were rescued and the trawler slipped into deep water.

== October ==
=== 1 October ===
List of shipwrecks: 1 October 1976
Ship	State	Description
Sherriffmuir	United Kingdom	The 102-foot (31 m), 180-ton Oil Field Standby (safety) Vessel, a former trawler, ran aground on Balmedie Beach north of Aberdeen. Scrapped in place August, 1983.

=== 9 October ===
List of shipwrecks: 9 October 1976
Ship	State	Description
Sea Witch	United States	The fishing vessel was wrecked on Saint Paul Island in the Pribilof Islands in the Bering Sea.

=== 12 October ===
List of shipwrecks: 12 October 1976
Ship	State	Description
Sylvia M. Ossa	Panama	The bulk carrier was last reported in the Atlantic Ocean (68°00′N 34°15′W) whilst on a voyage from Rio de Janeiro, Brazil to Philadelphia, Pennsylvania, United States. Presumed foundered with the loss of all hands.

=== 14 October ===
List of shipwrecks: 14 October 1976
Ship	State	Description
Boehlen	East Germany	The tanker sank in the English Channel during a storm with the loss of twenty-three of her thirty-six crew.
Mar del Oro	United States	The 156-gross register ton, 79.9-foot (24.4 m) shrimp-fishing vessel sank in the Shelikof Strait between the Kodiak Archipelago and the mainland of Alaska. A United States Coast Guard helicopter rescued her entire crew of six.

=== 15 October ===
List of shipwrecks: 15 October 1976
Ship	State	Description
Andros Antares	Liberia	The supertanker ran aground at Antifer, France in a storm.
Ante Oltmans	West Germany	The cargo ship foundered off the coast of the Netherlands in a storm. All six crew were killed.
Freeland	Cyprus	The cargo ship foundered off Brittany, France in a storm. All crew saved.
USS George K. MacKenzie	United States Navy	The Gearing-class destroyer was sunk as a target in the Pacific Ocean off California.

=== 18 October ===
List of shipwrecks: 18 October 1976
Ship	State	Description
Otterturm	West Germany	The tug collided with a barge and sank off Burghead, United Kingdom with the loss of one of her ten crew.

=== 20 October ===
List of shipwrecks: 20 October 1976
Ship	State	Description
George Prince	United States	The ferry sank in the Mississippi River after a collision with Frosta (Norway). Seventy-eight people were killed.

=== 23 October ===
List of shipwrecks: 23 October
Ship	State	Description
Eko	Cyprus	Lebanese Civil War: The cargo ship was sunk by mines off Lebanon.

=== 25 October ===
List of shipwrecks: 25 October 1976
Ship	State	Description
USS Tigrone	United States Navy	The Tench-class submarine was sunk as a target in the Atlantic Ocean off Cape Hatteras, North Carolina.

=== 27 October ===
List of shipwrecks: 27 October 1976
Ship	State	Description
Roadrunner	United States	The halibut-fishing vessel was swamped and wrecked on Kayak Island in the Gulf of Alaska off the south-central coast of Alaska.

=== 29 October ===
List of shipwrecks: 29 October 1976
Ship	State	Description
George Vancouver	United States	The Liberty ship foundered off the coast of Texas whilst under tow to a scuttling site off Freeport, Texas.

=== Unknown date ===
List of shipwrecks: Unknown date October 1976
Ship	State	Description
Coral Master	United States	The 78-foot (23.8 m) vessel sank off Alaska.

== November ==
=== 1 November ===
List of shipwrecks: 1 November 1976
Ship	State	Description
Vina	United States	The capsized fishing vessel was found on shore at Cedar Pass (56°46′N 135°11′W) in Southeast Alaska with both of her crewmen missing.

=== 22 November ===
List of shipwrecks: 22 November 1976
Ship	State	Description
Margaret A	United States	The 108-gross register ton motor vessel sank off Turnabout Island (57°07′30″N 133°58′40″W) in Frederick Sound in the Alexander Archipelago in Southeast Alaska.

=== 27 November ===
List of shipwrecks: 27 November 1976
Ship	State	Description
Mona	Greece	The fishing trawler was wrecked off "Cheka".

== December ==
=== 3 December ===
List of shipwrecks: 3 December 1976
Ship	State	Description
Achaios	Cyprus	The motor vessel ran aground on the Akrotiri Peninsula (34°37′N 32°55′E) on the coast of Cyprus and was wrecked.
Devon City	United Kingdom	The bulk carrier ran aground at Rügen Island, West Germany. She was refloated the next day and proceeded to Szczecin, Poland, for repairs.

=== 9 December ===
List of shipwrecks: 9 December 1976
Ship	State	Description
Doomba	Australia	The lighter was scuttled off Dee Why (33°42′58″S 151°20′50″E), New South Wales, Australia.

=== 11 December ===
List of shipwrecks: 11 December 1976
Ship	State	Description
Fog	United States	The 28-foot (8.5 m) vessel sank off the south-central coast of Alaska.

=== 15 December ===
List of shipwrecks: 15 December 1976
Ship	State	Description
Argo Merchant	Liberia	Argo Merchant The oil tanker ran aground at Nantucket Island, Massachusetts. She broke up and sank on 21 December, a total loss.
Unimak	United States	The fishing vessel was destroyed by fire in the Bering Sea.

=== 17 December ===
List of shipwrecks: 17 December 1976
Ship	State	Description
Sansinena	Liberia	Sansinena The oil tanker, taking on ballast, exploded at Port of Los Angeles, California, United States destroying buildings ashore.

=== 20 December ===
List of shipwrecks: 17 December 1976
Ship	State	Description
Mecca	Iceland	The ferry sank in the Red Sea after catching fire the previous day and drifting onto a reef.

=== 23 December ===
List of shipwrecks: 23 December 1976
Ship	State	Description
Santez-anna	United Kingdom	The fishing boat was lost west of Guernsey in the Channel Islands.
Seastar	Lebanon	The vessel ran aground on the Sha'b Abu Nuhas reef, remained stranded and finally sank in 1984.

=== 24 December ===
List of shipwrecks: 24 December 1976
Ship	State	Description
British Steel	United Kingdom	The yacht ran aground off Fuerteventura, Spain. All eight crew rescued, and the yacht was later refloated and returned to service.
MV Patra	Egypt	The passenger ship, the ex-Kronprins Frederik, was travelling with pilgrims between Jeddah and Suez when a fire broke out that exacerbated by poor and obsolete firefighting equipment. The ship sank due to the inability to extinguish the fire. 102 out of the 403 passengers and crew were lost.

=== 27 December ===
List of shipwrecks: 27 December 1976
Ship	State	Description
Unidentified midget submarine	Pakistan Navy	The SX-404-class midget submarine was lost in an accident with the loss of all hands.

=== Unknown date ===
List of shipwrecks: unknown date 1976
Ship	State	Description
Grand Zenith	Panama	The oil tanker vanished in the North Atlantic with the loss of all hands; the United States Coast Guard estimated she sank on 30 or 31 December.

== Unknown date ==
List of shipwrecks: unknown date 1976
Ship	State	Description
KRI Hardadali	Indonesian Navy	The missile boat sank after striking an underwater obstacle in early 1976.
Noah Webster	United States	The Liberty ship was scuttled off the coast of Alabama.
W. F. P.	United Kingdom	The 94-foot (29 m), 126-ton trawler sank in the Mediterranean Sea sometime in 1976.
