= MV George Prince ferry disaster =

1976 Mississippi River ship collision

Coordinates: 29.93813°N 90.36015°W

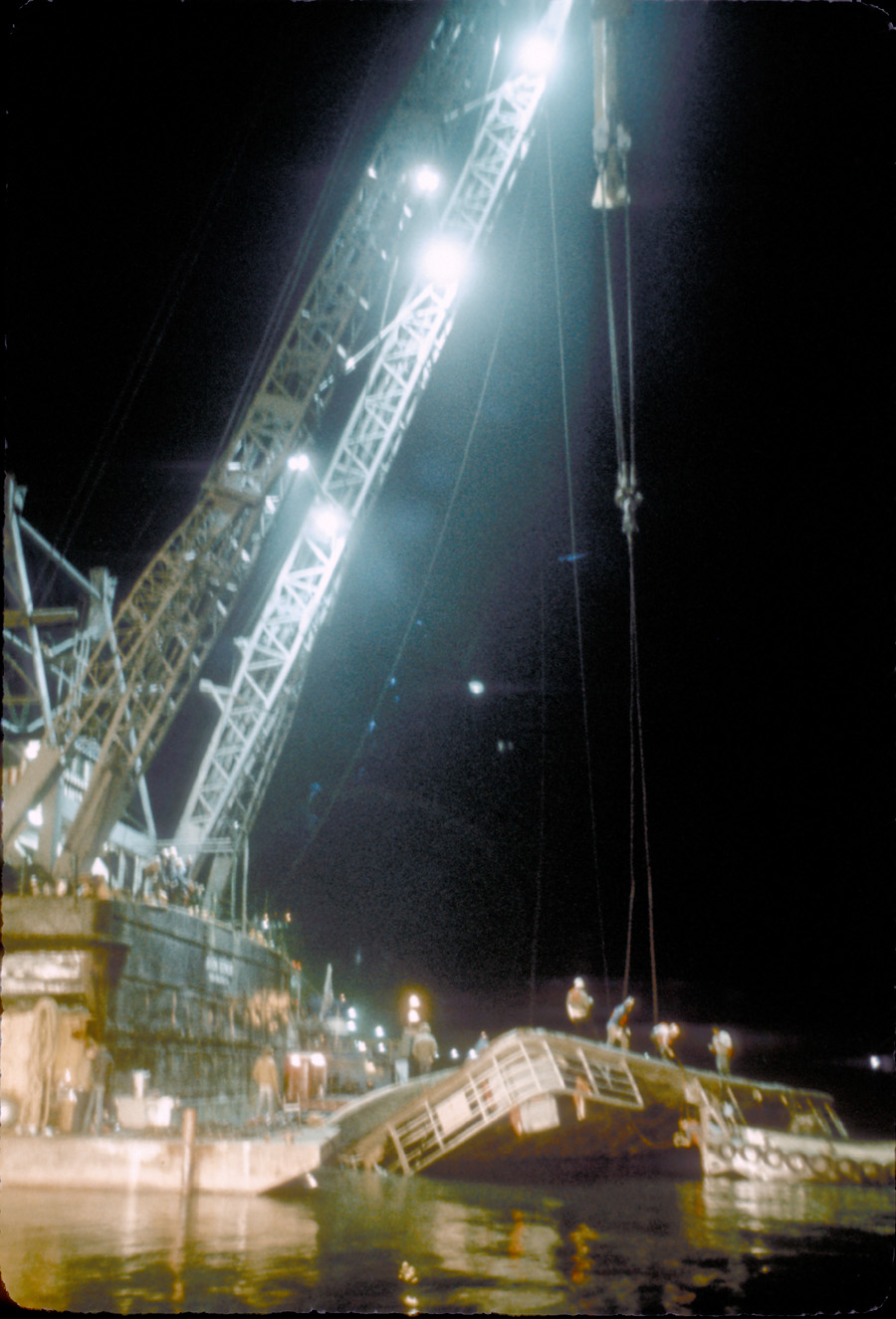
The MV George Prince about 20 hours after the accident at the Luling Ferry landing

The MV George Prince ferry disaster was a nautical disaster that occurred in the Mississippi River in St. Charles Parish, Louisiana, United States, on the morning of October 20, 1976. The Luling–Destrehan Ferry George Prince was struck by the Norwegian tanker SS Frosta, which was traveling upriver. The collision occurred at mile post 120.8 above Head of Passes, less than three-quarters of a mile from the construction site of the Luling Bridge which would replace the ferry seven years later. The ferry was crossing from Destrehan on the East Bank to Luling on the West Bank. Ninety-six passengers and crew were aboard the ferry when it was struck, and seventy-eight perished. This accident is the deadliest ferry disaster in United States history. It is also the deadliest peacetime nautical disaster involving a non-submersible vessel in U.S. waters since the explosion of the SS Grandcamp in 1947, which killed 581 people.

== Background ==
=== Luling–Destrehan Ferry operations ===
The Luling–Destrehan Ferry was one of three routes then operated by the Louisiana Department of Highways, District 2. The others were the pedestrian Taft–Norco Ferry and the vehicle Edgard–Reserve Ferry.

The ferry operated with two boats, the Ollie K. Wilds and the George Prince. The George Prince was the larger of the two, and operated around the clock, while the smaller boat only worked at peak hours. During peak hours, the ferries did not operate on a fixed schedule.

The ferry landings are pontoons connected to a shell road by a small ramp, and are held in place by pilings in the river bottom. The ferries made a "figure-8" transit, always running upriver when departing, letting the current carry the boat downriver, then turning upriver to land on the opposite bank.

The East Bank ferry landing was situated upriver of two busy grain elevators, limiting the boats' ability to maneuver and, when ships were present, obscuring the boats' radar. Visibility was often limited by clouds of grain dust from transfer operations, although no transfer was taking place the morning of the accident.

=== Motor vessel George Prince ===
The George Prince was a ferry owned and operated by the Louisiana Department of Highways, originally built in 1937 at Slidell, and converted for its final use at Avondale. In 1969, the U.S. Coast Guard ceased inspection and certification of the vessel at the request of the state of Louisiana. It was a free ferry and was not carrying passengers "for hire", so the Coast Guard complied with the request.

The George Prince was 120 feet (37 m) in length and 34 feet (10 m) in breadth, with a gross weight of 259 tons, and powered by a 670-horsepower (500 kW) diesel engine. She was equipped with two radar units (although only one was turned on at the time of the accident). Her crew of five consisted of a pilot, an engineer, and three deckhands.

The entire crew of the George Prince had duties while afloat; none of these duties were to serve as lookout. Had there been a designated lookout, there was no way for the lookout to communicate with the pilot except by hand signals.

=== SS Frosta ===
The SS Frosta was a tanker ship, built in 1961 in Germany and owned by A/S Ludwig, of Bergen, Norway. The Frosta was 664 feet (202 m) in length, 90 feet (27 m) in breadth, with a gross weight of 22,850 tons, and powered by a steam turbine engine, rated at 16,800 hp (12.5 MW).

The Frosta departed empty from Rotterdam, Netherlands, on October 4, bound for Baton Rouge, Louisiana. The voyage was uneventful. At the Southwest Pass of the Mississippi River, on the night of October 19, the Frosta took aboard the first of three pilots to guide her up the river. The pilot at the time of the collision was Nicholas Colombo, a member of the New Orleans-Baton Rouge Steamship Pilots Association, and the third pilot aboard the ship for the journey upstream. Colombo directed the ship take a speed equivalent to 12 miles per hour (19 km/h) upstream, his preferred speed. The crew ordered a speed of "half ahead", which gave them a forward momentum of 11.4 mph (18.3 km/h), stemming a current of 1.1 mph (1.8 km/h). When the ship was about a mile below the Luling–Destrehan ferry crossing, the pilot saw a ferry cross from the West Bank to the East Bank of the river. This was the MV Ollie K. Wilds, which worked the route along with the George Prince. At this time, the ship was on the west side of the channel, and was passing two ships moored to grain elevators on the East Bank of the river.

== Collision ==
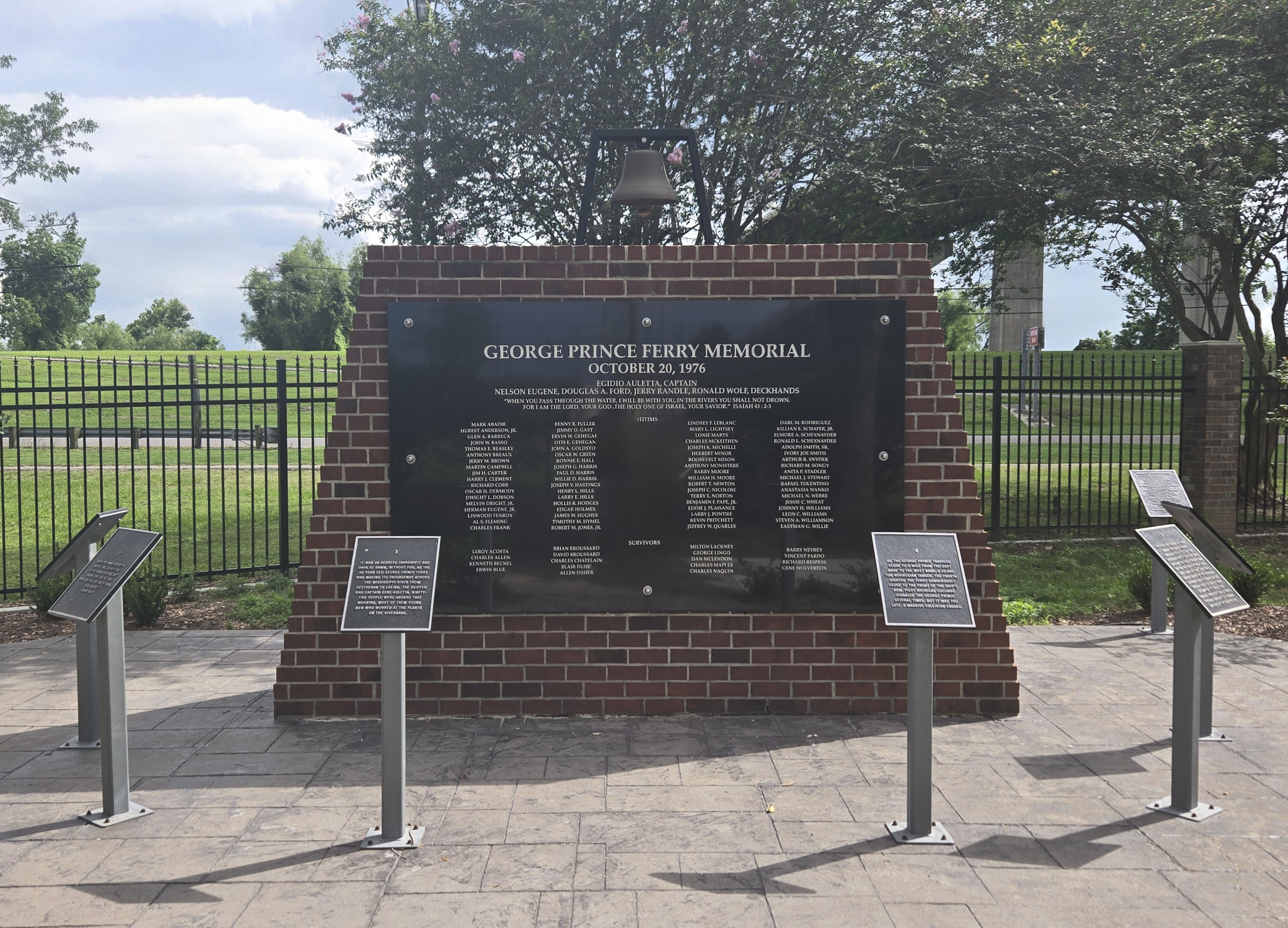
MV George Prince Ferry Disaster Memorial, Victims and Survivors Inscriptions

=== George Prince ===
At about 6:00am on October 20, 1976, the George Prince was berthed at the East Bank landing, taking on vehicles. Her crew had been on duty all night and was due to get off duty at 7:00. She was facing upriver and took on a full load of vehicles, consisting of 20 cars, eight trucks, six motorcycles, and an unknown number of pedestrians. Of the passengers aboard, there is no accounting of people in vehicles versus pedestrians. About 20 people were crowded in a waiting room to avoid the pre-dawn chill.

Once loaded, the George Prince departed and made a short run upriver before turning to cross the river. She did not give any indication of her departure by radio or horn. When operating in tandem, the ferries operated by sight with each other. The George Prince proceeded across the river, never changing course nor acknowledging radio traffic.

According to the survivors, some of the passengers were aware of the Frosta as it traveled upriver, and there was a growing anxiety over what appeared to be a collision course, although this anxiety was somewhat tempered by their belief that the ferry would maneuver to avoid the ship, especially since there was no indication of danger from the George Prince. When the Frosta sounded the danger signal, there was an immediate panic from those who could see the ship, and their flight from danger alerted others. It can never be known whether the passengers on the side opposite the oncoming ship were aware of the danger, as all the survivors were on the side of the impact. When the ferry had nearly finished its voyage across the river, she was struck near the middle of the port side by the bow of the Frosta. The force of the collision drove the stem of the Frosta 8 feet (2.4 m) into the side, impaling the George Prince on the port side and pushing her sideways up the river. The starboard side of the George Prince was quickly submerged, and the vessel capsized almost immediately. After capsizing, the ferry was driven under the ship, where the bottoms of the vessels collided.

All the vehicles were thrown off of the deck except for a motorcycle, which was entangled in the railing. One vehicle floated briefly before filling with water and sinking; the rest sank immediately.

Less than two minutes had elapsed since departing the dock.

The circumstances of a collision in 1974 resembled those of the 1976 tragedy except that, in the earlier accident, there were no fatalities. The accident occurred just before dawn in good visibility; the ferry operator failed to see the upbound vessels, though they were seen by the passengers on the deck; and the ferry operator failed to make good use of his radios to check for river traffic. Following the investigation by the Coast Guard, an administrative law judge suspended the ferry operator's license for three months. That decision was affirmed by the Coast Guard Commandant and by the National Transportation Safety Board in a decision adopted six days after the 1976 tragedy.

=== SS Frosta ===
With the East Bank ferry landing obstructed by ships, the Frosta could not see any activity at the landing until a quarter-mile away. At the point of collision, though, the river is more than half-a-mile wide. Having spotted the Ollie K. Wilds crossing, the pilot was aware of the ferry operation.

The pilot observed a ferry depart the East Bank landing, heading upriver. He called twice on his hand-held transceiver, waiting ample time between transmissions for a reply, but receiving none. He blew the ship's horn twice, indicating his desire to pass in front of the ferry. While the two-blast signal had no standing or meaning according to the "Western River Rules of the Road", it was commonly understood at the time for the ferry to give way and allow the ship to pass. At the time of the horn signal, the ferry had already turned to port, beginning to cross the river, and was less than a quarter-mile away.

The ferry did not respond, and the pilot again called on the radio, and repeated the two-blast signal on the ship's horn. The ferry still did not respond, and proceeded directly into the path of the Frosta.

At this point, the pilot began continuous radio calls and horn blasts. He also ordered the Frosta full astern. The pilot made no attempt to turn the ship, though. He was traveling on the west side of the channel; this gave him no choice but to turn the ship to the starboard, which, had the ferry turned, would have meant that the ship turned toward the ferry. The pilot also feared striking a bridge pier construction site just upriver, or running aground or into one of the ships docked at the grain elevator.

The ferry was on a constant bearing, less than 500 feet (150 m) away, when it passed out of sight of the Frosta's bridge crew. The crew felt a slight bump as the ship collided with the ferry. The ferry rolled off the bow of the ship to the starboard side, then rolled under, emerging on the ship's port side, 275 yards (251 m) from the bank. As the ferry came into view, it was nearly totally capsized. A vehicle was seen floating down the river, with its headlights still on, before filling with water and sinking.

The pilot ordered "all stop" on the engines to avoid hazarding any survivors with a churning propeller. The captain of the ship and the pilot both called for assistance from any vessel in the area, and notified the Coast Guard. The ship maneuvered through the construction area and anchored midstream over a mile upriver, carried most of this way by forward momentum. Once anchored, Frosta launched two of her life boats in a futile attempt to rescue survivors. None of the crew of the ship ever saw any survivors in the water.

== Rescue and recovery ==
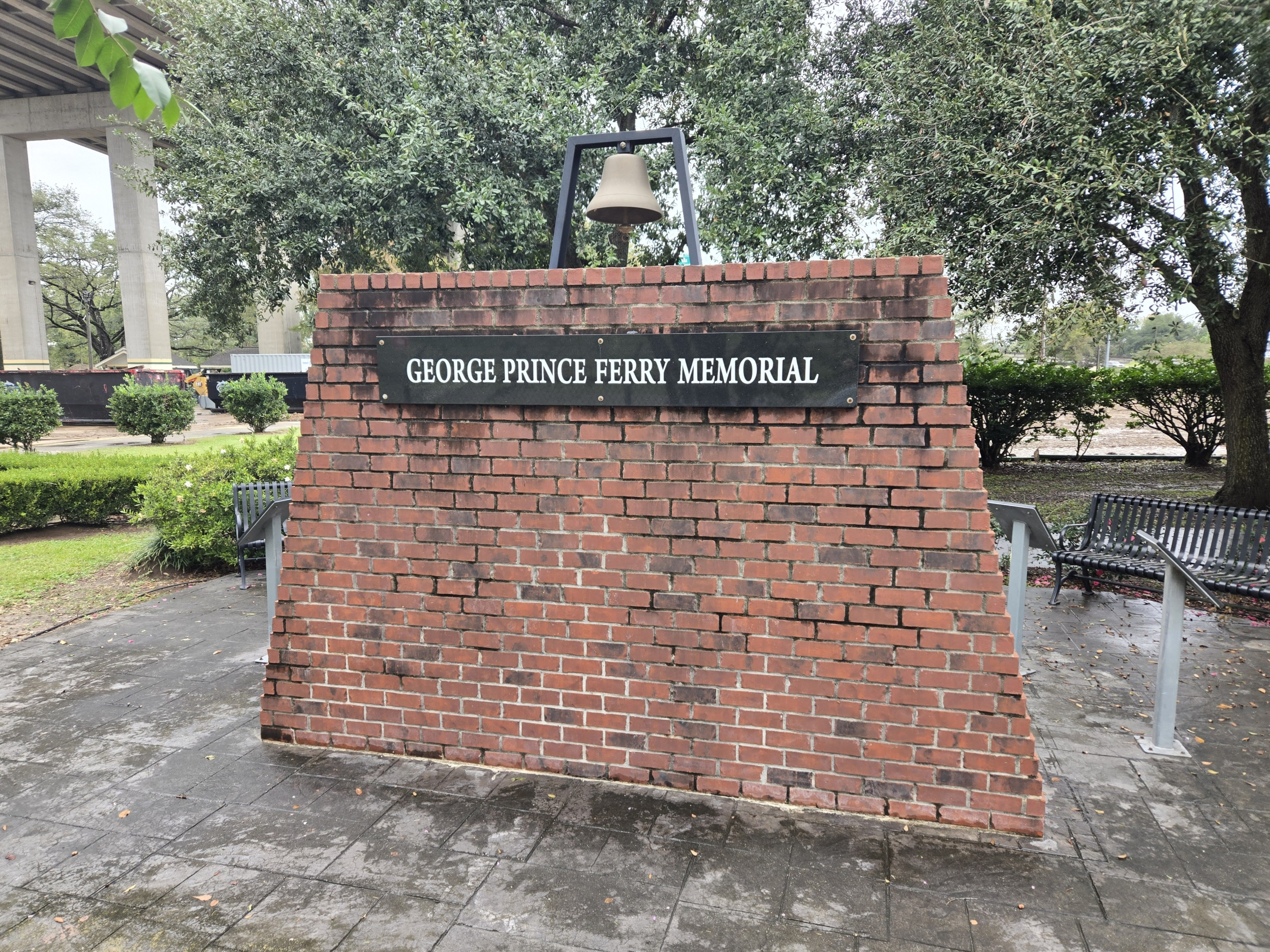
MV George Prince Ferry Disaster Memorial

=== Rescue ===
A total of 18 passengers survived the collision. Passengers who were able to see downstream became aware of the rapidly closing motions of the vessels, and rightly concluded that the collision was imminent. Fourteen of the survivors were thrown clear and surfaced without difficulty. Three others were briefly trapped under the George Prince. The last survivor had run back to his vehicle, thinking he would be safer in his truck. After the collision, he managed to escape his sinking vehicle through a window. Only one survivor had a life jacket before going into the water, but had not had time to put it on. Two others found life jackets floating in the river, which they used for a short time, but neither man had time to properly don the life jackets.

Aboard the Ollie K. Wilds, the crew in the pilot house did not see the collision. As they were preparing to offload vehicles, an engineer burst through the door, saying a passenger saw a ship run over the ferry. The captain of the ferry immediately ordered his vessel to cast off, having offloaded just one of his 15 vehicle load. He contacted the pilot of the Frosta, and asked him if the ferry had sunk. "He went in front of me, and I ran him over," was the pilot's reply.

A St. Charles Parish sheriff's deputy, who had been riding aboard the Ollie K. Wilds, used a radio aboard to report the collision to his dispatcher in Hahnville, and requested assistance.

The Ollie K. Wilds proceeded across the river cautiously, so as to not run over any survivors. As the ferries touched, passengers bridged the gap with benches from the waiting room, and sixteen survivors, perched on the overturned hull, came across to safety.

As the Ollie K. Wilds was crossing the river, a deck hand and the deputy had launched the small rescue boat. They pulled one survivor from the water.

The tugboat MV Alma S. was preparing to help turn one of the ships at the grain elevator. He heard the Frosta's pilot making the emergency calls, and heard the horn sounding. The crew cast off from the ship and proceeded slowly across the river toward the overturned ferry, with the survivors standing on the hull. Fifteen yards (14 m) from the George Prince, the crew heard a man call for help. The crew threw a life ring to him, and pulled him aboard.

All the survivors were taken to the West Bank ferry landing for the expected arrival of aid. All the passengers were taken to hospitals, and stayed there for at least 72 hours.

=== Recovery ===
The Coast Guard, immediately notified of the collision from the frantic radio calls, dispatched helicopters to the scene. One helicopter stopped at Lakefront Airport to pick up a diving team. The divers were airborne at 7:14, and arrived at 7:25. They were on the vessel at 7:34. They checked for survivors by tapping on the hull, with no response. At 8:33, they reported that there were no signs of life, and that other divers were needed to search inside the hull for bodies.

Having heard news media reports of the tragedy, a professional dive team drove themselves to the site and offered assistance. Being commercial divers, they were equipped with air line masks instead of tanks, and were much less restricted in their movements. They were also accustomed to working in the "blackout" conditions of the river. Large amounts of sediment obscure any vision in the river.

The dive team recovered nine bodies from the passenger compartment of the George Prince. Two more were recovered from the pilot house. The engine room held five bodies. One was found in a bathroom doorway, and another was found in a storeroom.

Fifty-seven bodies, and a portion of another, were found in submerged vehicles, as they were recovered from the river bottom between October 23 and October 27, 1976. One body was found in the river on May 22, 1977.

== Salvage and investigation ==
=== Salvage ===
Coordination and responsibility for salvage of the George Prince and her vehicles was assumed by the state's Director of Administration, Charles Roemer II, father of future governor Buddy Roemer.

That afternoon, a crane barge arrived on scene, and prepared to right and raise the ferry, which by now rested on the river bottom near the West Bank, with the hull barely protruding from the water. Overnight, the ferry was turned over by the salvage crew. The next morning, lifting operations began, and continued late into the night. At 10:00 p.m., the ferry was raised enough to permit dewatering operations, and the river reopened to limited marine traffic. The ferry was towed to the Louisiana Department of Highways yard in Plaguemine for further investigation. The damage was deemed irreparable, and the George Prince never sailed again.

=== Investigation ===
Investigators used the weather conditions from Moisant International Airport (now Louis Armstrong New Orleans International Airport), less than seven miles (11 km) away. Conditions there were recorded as a "clear, crisp, pre-dawn darkness, without fog, haze, or other local environmental impairment to visibility." Winds were from the north-northeast at 13 knots (24 km/h), with gusts to 20 knots (37 km/h).

The river conditions were measured at the Carrollton Gauge, 29 kilometres (18 mi) downriver. Maximum velocity was 1.5 mph (2.4 km/h), with average velocity of 1.16 mph (1.87 km/h), and the river was 2 feet (61 cm) above sea level.

Once it was raised, Coast Guard officials from the Marine Investigation Office boarded the ferry and examined the pilot house. One of the radar sets was off, another was on. The radio was turned on, and tuned to channel 13, the same channel used by the river pilot.

A plywood box was found in the pilot house, containing various logbooks and other documents, along with a half-pint bottle of Seagrams V. O. whiskey, with about an inch of whiskey remaining. No fingerprints could be recovered from the bottle, despite the efforts of the FBI laboratory in Washington, DC.

The body of the ferry pilot was autopsied by Orleans Parish coroner Dr. Frank Minyard. The blood alcohol level was determined to be 0.09%, just shy of the legal definition of alcohol intoxication (in 1976) of 0.10%. (The laws in Louisiana and every other state have changed since 1976; Auletta would have been defined as legally intoxicated under today's law in all 50 states.) No other drugs were present. Minyard's report stated that the pilot, Egidio Auletta, had been drinking and was experiencing a large degree of impairment at the time of his death at the helm.

== Conclusions of the investigation ==
=== Findings regarding the ferry ===
From the Coast Guard investigation report:

1. The George Prince, under the control of Egidio Auletta, departed and turned almost immediately to cross the river, because the current was slow and the volume of automobile traffic made it attractive to cross as quickly as possible.
2. The departure into stream traffic created a situation where risk of collision could exist, but Auletta did not signal his intent to cross the river by radio or horn. Had he announced his departure with the proper signal, and signaled his intent to cross in front of the Frosta, he would have made a rude but acceptable crossing of the river.
3. Due to complacency, fatigue, and/or the effects of alcohol, Auletta failed to detect the approaching ship until the final seconds before collision, when she disappeared from the view of the Frosta's pilot, by which time the collision was inevitable. The investigators concluded that he had time to maneuver to lessen the collision by making it a glancing blow, but the forward momentum and downstream current made the collision "beyond human remedy".
4. The primary cause of the tragedy was the navigation of George Prince into the channel without due regard to, or awareness of, river traffic and the risk of collision. The investigators stated that they "could not imagine a more vivid example to prove that keeping a proper lookout is the first rule of seamanship".
5. There was evidence of numerous violations on the part of Egidio Auletta. They are:
  1. failure to sound a horn upon departing a dock
  2. failure to keep a proper lookout
  3. failure to slacken speed, or, if necessary, stop and reverse when approaching another vessel so as to avoid risk of collision
  4. failure to signal intentions when crossing
  5. failure to navigate with caution until danger of collision is over
  6. use of a vessel in a negligent manner so as to endanger life, limb, and property

=== Findings regarding the pilot ===
From the Coast Guard investigation report:

1. Frosta's pilot, Nicholas Colombo, correctly assessed the risk of collision and sought agreement on a safe passage for both vessels. Local custom was for small vessels to give way to large vessels in stream traffic, due to the relative difficulty in maneuvering ships in the channel, but could not absolve him of the legal requirement to yield to traffic approaching from his starboard. According to the investigators, "This casualty is a classic example of the tragic consequences which can result from conflict between established custom and the law when each mandates a different response by the persons involved."
2. After sighting the Ollie K Wilds cross, Colombo, the Frosta's pilot made numerous attempts to contact the ferry, and saw the George Prince turn into his path immediately after departure. As the ferry continued into harm's way, failing to respond to the attempts to make contact, Colombo did not order a reduction in speed or reversal of engine until less than a minute before collision, and the ship finally responded to the "full astern" order with barely 15 seconds before striking the ferry.
3. Having chosen first to follow custom and then failing to make contact, Colombo should have considered the George Prince unresponsive and acted quickly and decisively to avert a collision.
4. Altering course:
  1. Colombo did not consider any turn to starboard practical. If he made a slight turn to starboard, and the ferry responded according to practice (to yield to the larger vessel), then he would have turned toward the ferry and a collision. If he made a radical turn to starboard, he would have been in jeopardy of collision with the ship moored at the grain elevator.
  2. He also did not consider a turn to port; since the ship was already favoring that side of the channel, there was little room to turn.
  3. Therefore, Colombo was forced to continue ahead.
5. Altering speed:
  1. Given the bulk of the ship and the time it would take to make an appreciable change in speed, the option to accelerate from the setting of "half ahead" to "full ahead" would have been futile.
  2. Colombo was obliged to slow Frosta. Given the close quarters, for any reduction in speed to be effective, it would have to be applied quickly. If he had decisively slowed the Frosta after not receiving a response to his first call, the collision could have been avoided or lessened, and the panel deemed this the prudent response.

The panel concluded that Colombo navigated the SS Frosta in a negligent manner.

=== Findings regarding the SS Frosta's captain ===
From the Coast Guard investigation report:

1. The captain of the Frosta, Kjell Sletten, was supervising his vessel's journey upriver via periodic visits to the pilothouse, observations he made by looking out his cabin window, and by the presence of his Mate, Peder Gasvaer, who was on the bridge. The mate was responsible to call the captain to the bridge in a situation that required his presence, although such situations were not defined. The mate did not notify Sletten until the sounding of the danger signal and the order for "full astern", seconds before the collision. The panel concluded that, although the bridge watch was not deficient, had the mate called for the captain earlier, that the captain may have had a lower threshold for the ferry's actions and might have acted sooner.
2. A master of the ship can delegate, but does not abdicate, responsibility for safe navigation to the mate. Therefore, as captain, Sletten is ultimately responsible for the safe navigation of the Frosta.
3. The panel concluded that Sletten allowed the Frosta to be used in a negligent manner.

=== Miscellaneous findings ===
From the Coast Guard investigation report:

1. The 18 persons who never escaped from the interior of the George Prince drowned almost immediately as the interior flooded through numerous openings in the hull including doors and windows. There was not sufficient air trapped in the hull to sustain life.
2. Most of the people who died were trapped under the overturned hull or in their vehicles, and could not find a clear path to the surface. An unknown number may have reached the surface but, because of injuries or inability to swim, did not survive.
3. There is no evidence of equipment or material failure of either vessel which caused or contributed to the tragedy.
4. Life saving equipment provided aboard the George Prince was of little use in this accident. Life jackets are designed to aid in escaping a vessel which is slowly sinking, not the sudden collision and immediate capsizing which occurred, which was beyond the scope of the life-saving equipment available.
  1. Life jackets floating free in the river did aid two people remain afloat and reaching the safety of the overturned ferry.
  2. The rescue boat of the Ollie K. Wilds served its designed purpose; that is, rescue of a few individuals from the river. It could not have coped with a large number of survivors in the water, if, for instance, the overturned ferry did not remain afloat.
5. The response of the Ollie K. Wilds, commercial towboats, and the local Coast Guard units was commendable. Had the ferry not overturned so rapidly, their immediate response would have been instrumental in saving a number of lives. Unfortunately, the first rescuers were only able to find and rescue two survivors from the river; other survivors made their way onto the overturned hull.

=== Coast Guard Commandant's remarks ===
From the Coast Guard investigation report:

1. Circumstances of the collision prevent the usual application of the "Western Rivers Rules of the Road", which state that a vessel to the starboard has right-of-way (which is why all powered vessels have a red light facing to port, and a green light facing to starboard). George Prince was expected to do one of three things: head down river to pass behind the Frosta, slow and/or stop midstream and wait for the Frosta to pass, or proceed directly across to the West Bank. Only two minutes elapsed between the departure of the ferry and the collision. Since there was doubt as to the intention of the George Prince, and there was no response to attempts to determine the ferry's intentions, the duty of the pilot of the Frosta was to immediately reverse engine and sound the danger signal.
2. The George Prince proceeded across the busy waterway apparently oblivious to the imminent danger. Auletta apparently never sighted the Frosta, nor did he hear the radio calls or horn signals. A reasonably alert pilot would have seen the ship coming upriver. Even though a strict application of the "Rules of the Road" gave the George Prince the right-of-way, this of course does not give the right to proceed into harm's way without taking any evasive maneuvers.
3. Neither vessel took any early or substantial action to avoid the collision.
4. Auletta's judgement and reaction were certainly impaired by the 0.09% blood alcohol content, although to what degree can not be known, although three areas have been well established as affected by alcohol levels under 0.10%:
  1. steadiness, orientation, and balance,
  2. attention, memory, and information processing,
  3. peripheral vision and visual field
5. In this circumstance, the ability of the eyes to adjust to darkness, to detect moving targets at low levels of illumination, and mental attentiveness are all affected. The Commandant states,"It is imperative that the deck watch of any vessel be in complete control of his faculties", and the evidence shows that Auletta was not in control of his faculties, as it is inconceivable that such an experienced mariner could either ignore or fail to see the Frosta unless his faculties were impaired.
6. The captain of the Ollie K Wilds stated that the windows of his pilot house were closed, and that he did not hear the Frosta's horn. A previous accident involving the George Prince followed a similar scenario. On that occasion, the captain of the ferry stated that he did not hear the sounding of vehicle horns or the shouts of passengers. The morning of the accident, the windows were likely closed, and this may have prevented Auletta from hearing the Frosta's horn. Therefore, it is imperative that a lookout be designated and posted outside to listen for and relay signals from other vessels.

=== The legal proceeding initiated by Louis Koerner on the day of the disaster and the how it was facilitated by Koerner's early adoption of technology ===
Just before the New Orleans federal court's clerk's office was to close on the day of the disaster, a vessel seizure was initiated to secure claims on behalf of victims and their families. A significant early role was played by New Orleans maritime attorney Louis Koerner, who acted within hours of the collision to preserve U.S. jurisdiction over the foreign vessel involved and to protect recovery of potential claims against its owners.

Because the tanker involved was foreign-flagged, maritime law required that an in rem seizure complaint be filed immediately to prevent the vessel from departing U.S. waters and to ensure the availability of its crew as witnesses. Koerner undertook emergency legal preparations on the day of the accident and filed the necessary maritime lien before the close of court, allowing a seizure to be made and preventing the vessel from leaving Louisiana.

Koerner's ability to meet this narrow deadline was aided by his use of an early computer-based word processing system, a technology that was largely unfamiliar in legal practice in 1976. By using prior pleadings rather than drafting documents from scratch, he was able to rapidly prepare and print the required filings within the limited time available. This early adoption of word processing technology enabled a timely filing that preserved claims not only for his initial client but also for numerous other victims who later joined the consolidated action.

Following the first suit and the vessel seizure, the case proceeded under judicial supervision with a plaintiffs’ committee representing the affected parties. The courts ultimately apportioned liability between the State of Louisiana, as owner and operator of the ferry, and the foreign company that owned the tanker. All claims were resolved within approximately one year of the accident, an unusually rapid conclusion for a complex maritime disaster case. Total settlements exceeded $24 million, with the tanker's owners paying more than $8 million to victims and their families.

Koerner's actions are frequently cited as an early example of how emerging word processing technology influenced legal practice by accelerating document preparation and enabling rapid procedural responses in time-critical litigation. Koerner continues to use technology to enhance his effectiveness and uses AI in legal research and in many other aspects of case preparation.

== Closing of the ferry ==
With the opening of the Luling–Destrehan Bridge in October 1983—barely a mile upstream from the ferry landings—the ferry ceased operations. At the dedication of the bridge, both governor David C. Treen and Bishop Stanley Ott remembered those killed in the accident.

The asphalt ramps to the tops of the levees still exist, but have fallen into disrepair.

== Documentary and memorial ==
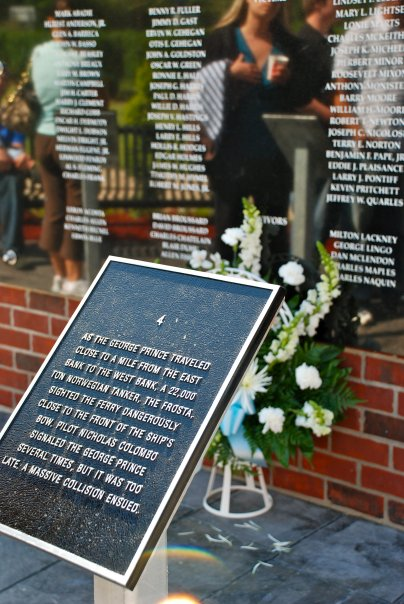
MV George Prince Ferry Disaster Memorial, Investigation and Deceased

The disaster was all but officially forgotten until 2006, when historian and filmmaker Royd Anderson wrote and directed the documentary The Luling Ferry Disaster for his Master's thesis project in Communication at the University of Louisiana at Lafayette. The film was released on the 30th anniversary of the disaster and sparked a movement to bring a memorial for the victims and survivors to St. Charles Parish, Louisiana. Soon after the movie's release, on November 6, 2006, local government officials voted to have 2 memorials constructed, but the issue lost traction after those elected officials were not re-elected the following year. Anderson raised the issue again to the newly elected parish president and officials, bringing a score of relatives of the victims to a council meeting on January 28, 2009. A memorial committee led by St. Charles Parish Councilman Larry Cochran was formed soon afterwards, composed of family members and friends of the deceased, St. Charles Parish Council members, and concerned citizens, including Anderson. The committee met for several months, voting on where the monument should be placed and what it should look like. St. Charles Parish Councilman Paul J. Hogan, an architect, created the design for the monument. Local suppliers, vendors, companies, and individuals donated the equipment, labor, and materials to build it. The memorial was unveiled in a solemn ceremony at the East Bank Bridge Park in Destrehan on October 17, 2009, with over 300 people in attendance. A bell rang as each name was called; a white balloon rose in memory of each of the deceased, and a blue balloon rose in memory of each of the survivors. By the end, 95 balloons were drifting slowly over the Mississippi River near the spot where the accident occurred.

== See also ==
- List of shipwrecks in 1976
- PS General Slocum
- Sea Wing disaster
- SS Eastland
