= Boscardin =

Boscardin is an Italian surname. Notable people with the surname include:

- Bruno Boscardin (born 1970), Swiss racing cyclist
- Maria Bertilla Boscardin (1888–1922), Italian nun and nurse
