= Bertilla =

Bertilla, Bertille or Bertila may refer to:

- Bertille of Thuringia (died c. 600)
- Bertilia (died 687), also called Bertilla, Frankish virgin saint
- Berthild of Chelles (died 692), also called Bertilla, Frankish abbess
- Bertille of Marœil (died c. 697)
- Bertila of Spoleto (died 915), queen consort of Italy
- Bertil Almqvist (1902–1972), nicknamed Bertila, Swedish writer and illustrator
