= Royd Anderson =

Cuban-American filmmaker and historian (born 1972)

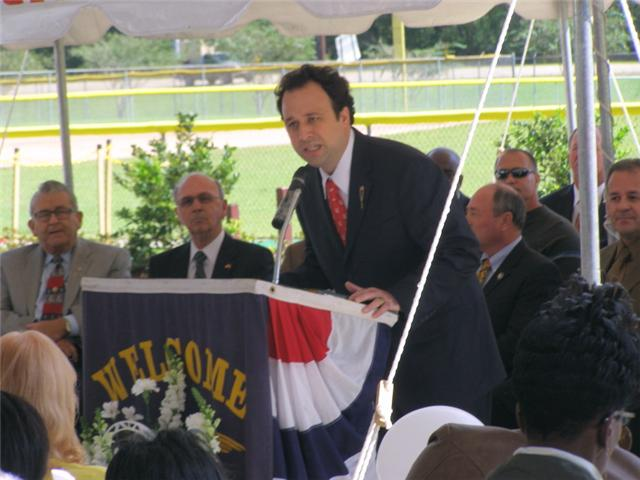
- Royd Anderson speaking at the George Prince Ferry Memorial Ceremony, October 17, 2009
- Born: July 22, 1972 (age 53); New Orleans, Louisiana
- Occupation: Filmmaker

Royd Anderson (born July 22, 1972, New Orleans, Louisiana) is a Cuban-American filmmaker and historian based in New Orleans, Louisiana. He specializes in documentary films pertaining to tragic Louisiana events often overlooked by historians.

== Career ==
In 2006, Anderson wrote and directed the documentary The Luling Ferry Disaster for his Master's thesis project in Communication at the University of Louisiana at Lafayette. The film recounts the story of the MV George Prince ferry disaster, the worst ferryboat accident in U.S. history with 77 fatalities. The documentary was released on the 30th anniversary of the disaster on October 20, 2006. The success of the film generated a movement, initiated by Anderson, to build a monument in St. Charles Parish for the victims and survivors. The Luling/Destrehan Ferry Disaster Memorial Committee, led by St. Charles Parish Councilman Larry Cochran, was established on January 28, 2009, consisting of family members and friends of the deceased, St. Charles Parish Council members, and concerned citizens, along with Anderson. Through the work of the bureau, a memorial was finally erected. It was unveiled in a solemn ceremony on October 17, 2009, at the East Bank Bridge Park in Destrehan, Louisiana. St. Charles Parish Councilman and architect Paul J. Hogan designed the monument.

In 2007, Anderson wrote and directed the documentary The Continental Grain Elevator Explosion. The film documents the deadliest grain dust explosion of the modern era, occurring on December 22, 1977, at the Continental Grain plant in Westwego, Louisiana. 36 lives were lost.

Pan Am Flight 759 is Anderson's third documentary, released in 2012. The film examines the worst plane crash in Louisiana history, occurring on July 9, 1982, in the city of Kenner. At 76 minutes, it is his longest film to date. An edited-for-TV version of the documentary (58 mins.) was aired on Cox 4 in three Louisiana regions: New Orleans, Baton Rouge, and Acadiana.

Anderson's 4th film, The Upstairs Lounge Fire, documents the 1973 UpStairs Lounge arson attack in New Orleans. The documentary was released on June 24, 2013, to commemorate the 40th anniversary of the fire.

His 2019 documentary, Mother's Day Bus Crash on 610, investigates the worst vehicular accident in Louisiana history, occurring on May 9, 1999, on Interstate 610 in New Orleans. 22 perished. With the backing of New Orleans City Park CEO Rebecca Dietz and through private donations, Anderson established a permanent memorial for the victims in 2026, after five years of disinterest and delays from the park's two previous CEOs.. The historical marker is located on the lawn at the entrance of Pan Am Stadium, on Zachary Taylor Dr., a few yards from the crash site.

On November 22, 2021, Anderson released his first book, New Orleans Disasters: Firsthand Accounts of Crescent City Tragedy, published by The History Press. It explores seven tragedies and their fallout through gripping firsthand interviews, planting readers amid the chaos. The book peaked at number four in Amazon's 'New Releases in Disaster Relief' category in December 2021.

In 2022, Anderson wrote and directed his sixth documentary, The Rault Center Fire. The film documents the New Orleans high-rise disaster that occurred on November 29, 1972. Six lives were lost.

In honor of the 20th anniversary of Hurricane Katrina in 2025, Anderson wrote and directed his seventh documentary, Leading Ladies of Hurricane Katrina. The film features the remarkable women who made a differnce for the betterment of their community, city, state and region. Among those highlighted are Louisiana Governor Kathleen Blanco and civic activist and founder of Levees.Org, Sandy Rosenthal.

== Awards and honors ==
Anderson's films The Luling Ferry Disaster and The Continental Grain Elevator Explosion were honored at the Pelican d'Or Short Film Festival at Nunez Community College, winning the Best Documentary category in 2007 and 2008. He was awarded Delgado Community College's Circles of Excellence Outstanding Alumni Award in 2011. At the 2013 Lake Charles Film Festival, Pan Am Flight 759 won the Best Documentary category. The UpStairs Lounge Fire was selected the best Documentary Short of the Boomtown Film & Music Festival in Beaumont, Texas in 2016. At the 2025 Lake Charles Film Festival, Leading Ladies of Hurricane Katrina won both the Best Documentary and Best Home Grown Film categories.

Anderson was invited to Princeton University as a guest speaker to screen and discuss The UpStairs Lounge Fire in 2014. He was also an invited guest speaker at Tulane University, Loyola University New Orleans, and the FBI New Orleans Division. His documentaries have been accepted into The Historic New Orleans Collection, one of Louisiana's prestigious archives.

== Personal life ==
On television, Anderson has been a featured guest on HauntTV, the LMN (TV channel)'s show Ghost Inside My Child, the Louisiana Public Broadcasting network show Louisiana: The State We're In, the WYES-TV news program Informed Sources, WGNO ABC 26's Good Morning New Orleans, and Netflix's show Animal House. He is an alumnus of Loyola University New Orleans, the University of Louisiana at Lafayette, and Delgado Community College. In addition to being a filmmaker, Anderson is also a former high school teacher.

== Filmography ==
- 2006 The Luling Ferry Disaster
- 2007 The Continental Grain Elevator Explosion
- 2012 Pan Am Flight 759
- 2013 The Upstairs Lounge Fire
- 2019 Mother's Day Bus Crash on 610
- 2022 The Rault Center Fire
- 2025 Leading Ladies of Hurricane Katrina
