= Madonna dei Prati, Brendola =

Catholic church in Vicenze province, Italy

Coordinates: 45°28′12.0″N 11°26′17.9″E

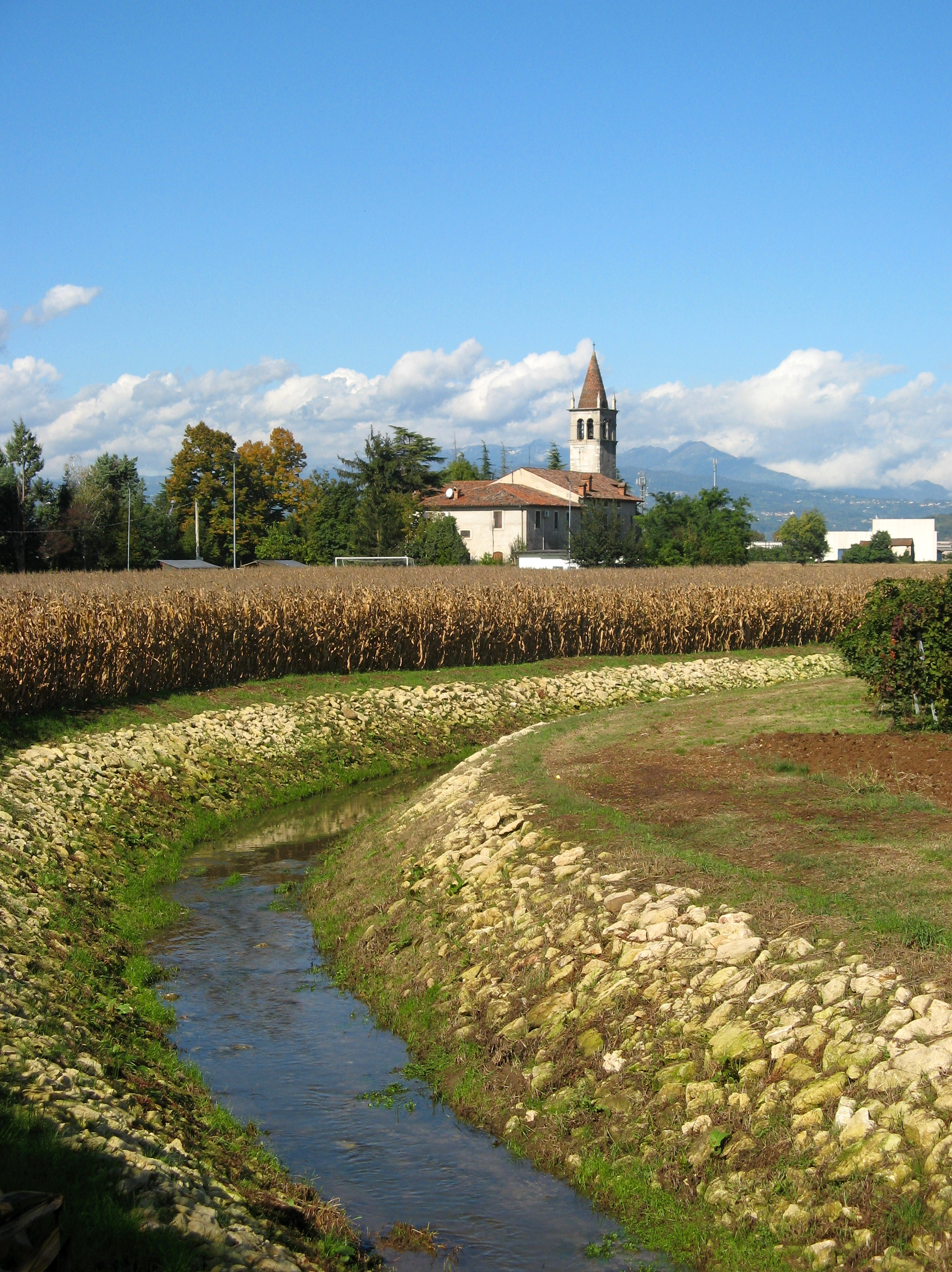
Madonna dei Prati seen from the south

Madonna dei Prati is a Roman Catholic church and monastic complex in Brendola, Province of Vicenza, Region of Veneto, Italy.

It is suspected the church was likely built atop an ancient, perhaps pagan temple. In 1606, the small church was incorporated into a larger temple, and affiliated with the Carmelite order which remained till 1658. The church had the patronage of the Revese family.

In 1950, the church was assigned to a small parish and titled Madonna dei Prati. The exterior is simple with entrance portals dating to the 15th century. The interior has a painted wooden ceiling; the main altar was sculpted by Giovanni Maria Comun of Grancona. In the presbytery are paintings by Francesco Maffei.
