= Oratory of Santa Maria Annunciata, Brendola =

Catholic oratory in Brendola, Italy

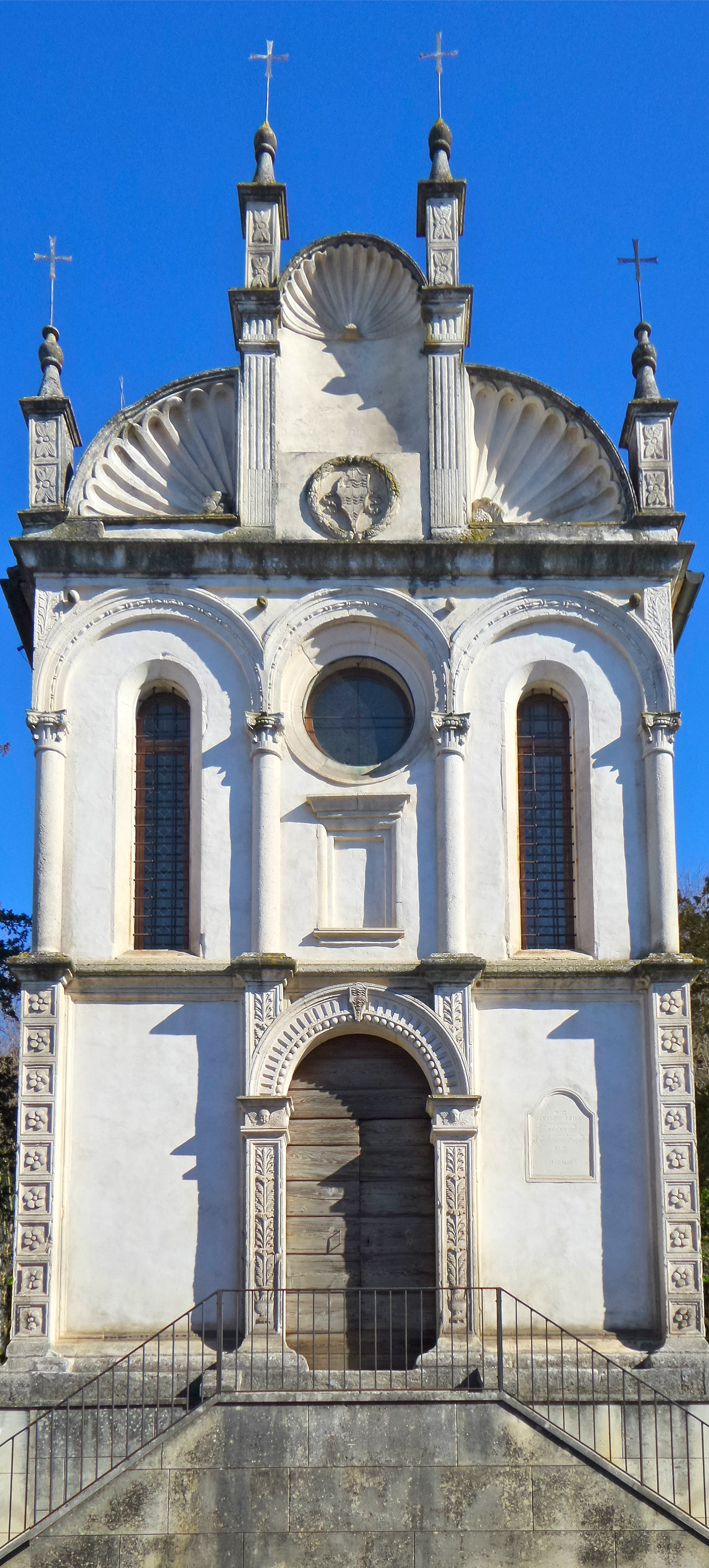
Façade of the oratory

The Oratory of Santa Maria Annunciata (Chiesetta Revese) in Brendola, Province of Vicenza, is a free-standing, Renaissance style chapel.

It was commissioned by the aristocratic Revese family with local properties. An inscription dates to 1466, but construction occurred from 1486 to 1499, with a design attributed to Alvise Lamberti of Montagnana, a collaborator of Pietro Lombardo in Venice and Lorenzo da Bologna in Vicenza. A controversy exists whether Alvise is the same as Aloisio the New, who designed the Cathedral of the Archangel in the Moscow Kremlin. The facade of this oratory recalls the Lamberti work of Santa Maria dei Miracoli in Lonigo. Both these recalls some of the work of Mauro Codussi and Pietro Lombardo, including the latter's Santa Maria dei Miracoli, Venice.

The tall nave has two orders of pilasters, and has shell-like ribbing in the tympanum. The front is topped with four small spires with iron crosses. The interior frescoes are attributed to Giovanni Buonconsiglio. They depict, a Crucifixion with St Catherine of Siena; a Saint in local vista; a Resurrected Christ; and depictions of St Roch and St Sebastian. The statues in the apse represent the Annunciation and date from the 15th century.

The oratory remained in the Revese family and they added the last restoration in the end of the 19th century. The oratory then became property of the Scola family. In 1989, it became property of the comune, who concluded a restoration in 1989.
