= Brendola =

- Comune
- Comune di Brendola
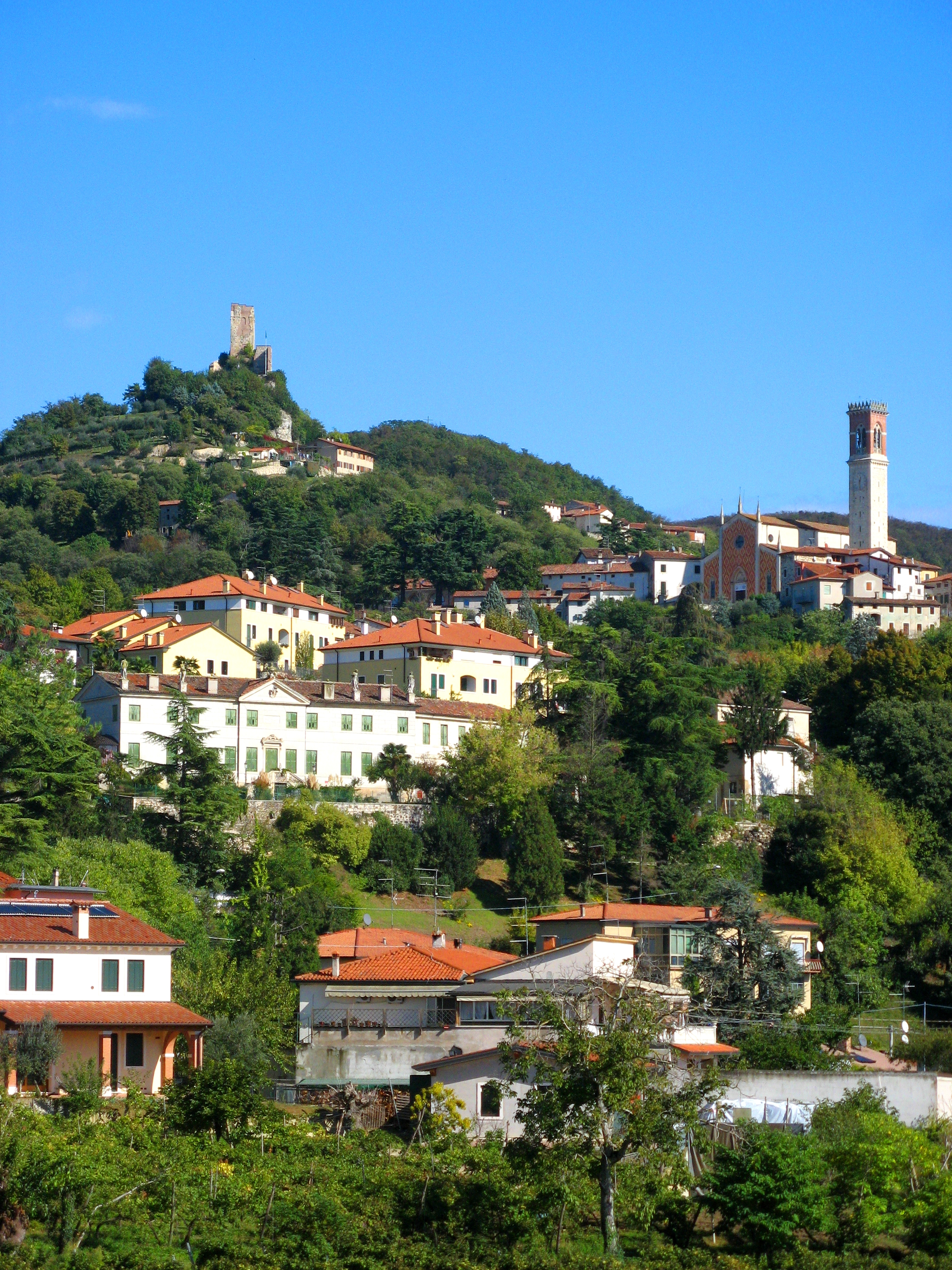
- View of Brendola

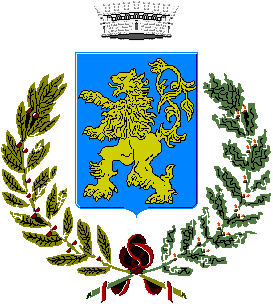
- Coat of arms

- Location within Italy Location within Veneto
- Coordinates: 45°28′24″N 11°26′45″E
- Country: Italy
- Region: Veneto
- Province: Vicenza (VI)
- Frazioni: Ca'Vecchie, San Vito, Rondole, Ca'Nova, Scarantello, Goia, Pedocchio, Vò

Government
  - Mayor: Bruno Beltrame

Area
  - Total: 25.57 km^{2} (9.87 sq mi)
- Elevation: 156 m (512 ft)

Population (30 April 2017)
  - Total: 6,638
  - Density: 259.6/km^{2} (672.4/sq mi)
- Demonym: Brendolani
- Time zone: UTC+1 (CET)
  - Summer (DST): UTC+2 (CEST)
- Postal code: 36040
- Dialing code: 0444
- Patron saint: Saint Roch, Saint Maria Bertilla Boscardin
- Saint day: March 3
- Website: Official website

Brendola is a town and comune in the province of Vicenza, Veneto, northern Italy. It is south of the A4 motorway.

Its landmarks include the church of Madonna dei Prati and the Oratory of Santa Maria Annunciata a Caasa Revese, a free-standing, Renaissance style chapel.
