= Maria Bertilla Boscardin =

Italian Roman Catholic saint

Saint Maria Bertilla Boscardin
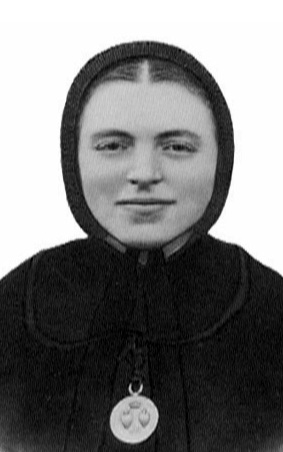
- Born: 6 October 1888; Brendola, Veneto, Italy
- Died: 20 October 1922 (aged 34); Treviso, Italy
- Venerated in: Roman Catholic Church
- Beatified: June 8, 1952 by Pope Pius XII
- Canonized: May 11, 1961 by Pope John XXIII
- Major shrine: Vicenza, Veneto, Italy
- Feast: October 20

Maria Bertilla Boscardin (6 October 1888 – 20 October 1922) was an Italian nun and nurse who displayed a pronounced devotion to duty in working with sick children and victims of the air raids of World War I. She was later canonized a saint by the Roman Catholic Church. Because of her difficult upbringing and devoted care for the neglected, she is recognized as a patron saint of the rejected and abused.

== Life ==
=== Early life ===
She was born Anna Francesca Boscardin at Brendola, Veneto. In her family and town she was known as Annette. She was a member of a peasant family. Her father, Angelo Boscardin, would testify during her beatification process that he was jealous, violent, and frequently drunk. As a child she could only attend school irregularly, as she was needed to help at home and in the fields. When she did attend school she also worked as a servant in a nearby home. She did not display any particular talents, was thought to be not particularly intelligent, and was often the target of insulting jokes. These included being referred to as a "goose" for her slowness by a local clergyman.

She was allowed to make her First Holy Communion at eight and a half years old, when the authorized age in those years was eleven. At twelve years old, she was accepted into the parish association of the “Children of Mary” association. The parish priest gave her a catechism as a gift. They found it in the pocket of her habit, when she died, at 34 years old.

=== Vicenza ===
After being rejected for admission to one order because of her slowness, she was accepted as a member of the Teachers of Saint Dorothy, Daughters of the Sacred Heart at Vicenza in 1904, taking the name "Maria Bertilla". She herself internalized some of her earlier criticism, telling the novice-mistress of the order, "I can't do anything. I'm a poor thing, a goose. Teach me. I want to be a saint." She worked there as a kitchen maid and laundress for three years.

=== Treviso ===
She was then sent to Treviso to learn nursing at the municipal hospital there, which was under the direction of her order. During her training period, she was once placed to work in the kitchen. However, upon completing her training, she was promoted to working with victims of diphtheria in the hospital's children's ward. During the air raids of Treviso following the disastrous Battle of Caporetto, the hospital fell under the control of the military. Sister Bertilla was noted for her unwavering care of her patients, particularly those who were too ill to be moved to safety.

This devotion to duty attracted the attention of the authorities of a local military hospital. However, her superioress did not appreciate Sister Bertilla's work and reassigned her to work in the laundry, a position she remained in for four months until being reassigned by a higher superior, who put Sister Bertilla in charge of the children's isolation ward at the hospital. Shortly thereafter, Sister Bertilla's already poor health got worse. A painful tumor which she had had for several years had progressed to the point of requiring an operation, which she did not survive. She died in 1922.

== Veneration ==
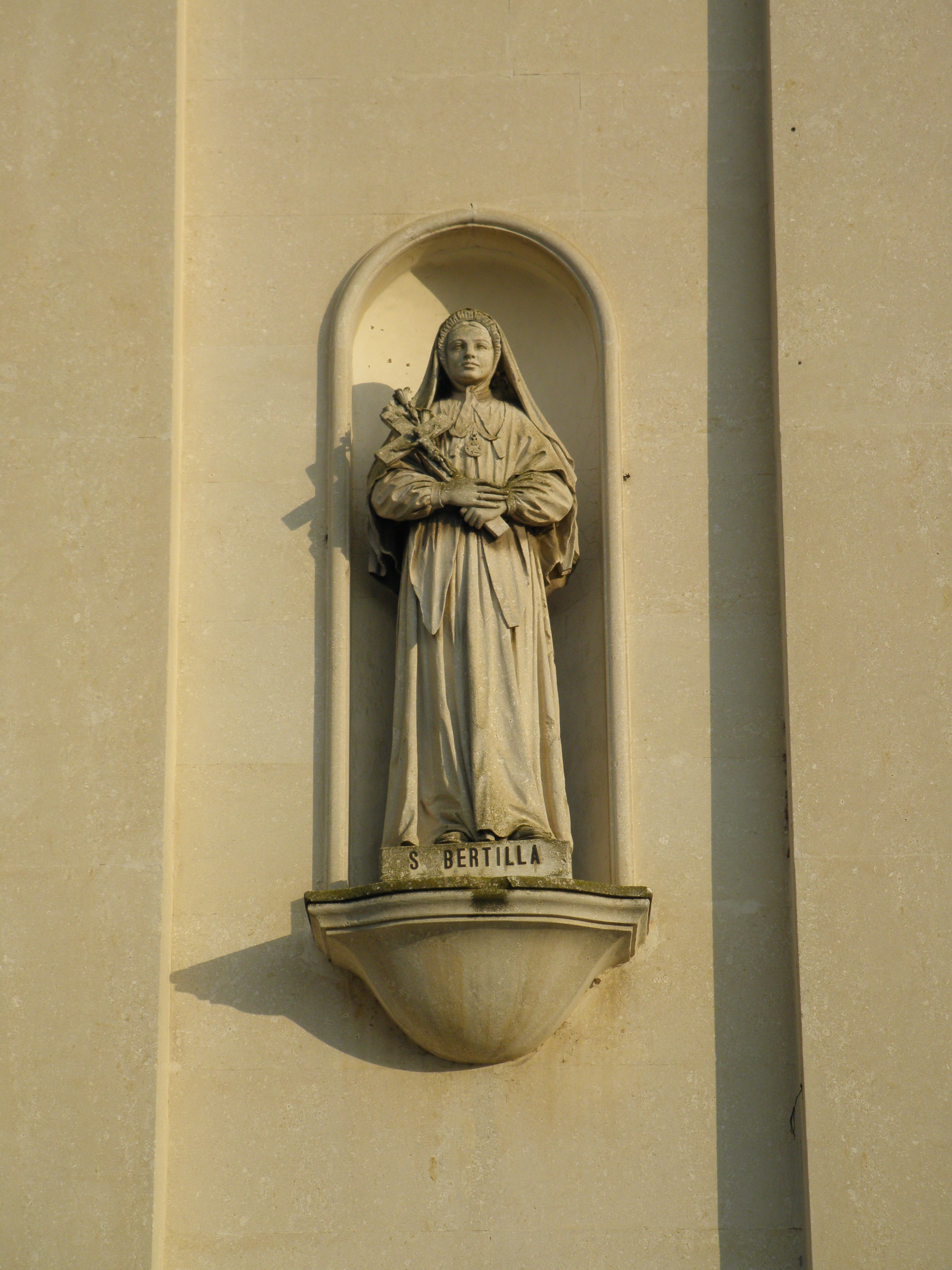
A statue of Saint Bertilla at the Church of Saints Peter and Paul, near Noventa Vicentina, Italy

Her reputation for simplicity and devoted, caring hard work had left a deep impression on those who knew her. A memorial plaque placed on her tomb refers to her as "a chosen soul of heroic goodness ... an angelic alleviator of human suffering in this place." Crowds flocked to her first grave at Treviso. After a tomb was erected for her at Vicenza, it became a pilgrimage site where several miracles of healing were said to have taken place.

In 1961, 39 years after her death, Boscardin was canonized as a saint. The crowd in attendance included members of her family as well as some of her patients. Saint Bertilla is known as a patron saint of the rejected, lonely, and abused. She is attributed with saying: "we should never allow ourselves to be disturbed by things that are transitory and not eternal,” and: “In whatever state we are, let us strive to remain in the hands of God.” Her feast day is October 20.
