= Kirk Pride =

Cargo ship

History

United States
- Name: Kirk Pride
- Owner: Kirkconnell Shipping Co.
- Homeport: Tampa, Florida
- Fate: Sunk, 9 January 1976

General characteristics
- Type: Transport
- Tonnage: 498 GT
- Length: 170 ft (52 m)
- Crew: 11

Kirk Pride was a cargo ship that operated in the Cayman Islands, from 1947 to 1976.

== Background ==
MS Kirk Pride was a Tampa, Florida-based, a 170 ft (52 m), 498 GT freight vessel owned by Kirkconnell Shipping Co., and piloted by William Kirkconnell, with a crew of 11. On 4 October 1974, the US Coast Guard escorted the freighter to port after severe weather resulted in a significant amount of water entering the ballast tanks.

== Shipwreck ==
In January 1976, Kirk Pride was docked in the harbor of George Town, Cayman Islands, awaiting repairs to her engines. An approaching storm prompted authorities to move the ship to a deeper location. Her engines malfunctioned though and would not turn on when they were supposed to, this resulted in Kirk Pride being driven into a reef during the storm. Authorities attempted for days to keep her afloat from the damage done to her hull, until the attempts failed and the ship was abandoned. Kirk Pride was abandoned when she sank, so there was no loss of life in the sinking. The ship sank on 9 January 1976, off the edge of the Cayman Wall, a 3,000 ft (910 m) drop off in the ocean floor off the edge of George Town.

It was initially believed that the wreckage sank to the bottom of the Cayman Wall. In 1985, she was discovered at a depth of 780 ft (240 m) feet of water. Trapped by two pinnacles, one at the bow and another at the stern, it rolled down the 45–60° slope to the edge of the shelf. Underwater visibility is approximately 300 ft (91 m) horizontally at this depth and twice that when looking upward.

The ship has interested divers following its sinking. A brief film of the wreck can be viewed on the episode "Reefs and Wrecks" of the BBC television series Wild Caribbean, produced in 2008. The name of the ship is visible at filming on the stern.

An expeditionary dive was conducted by S.U.C.C. in the early 2000, but due to an error in gas mixing, and the death of a diver, J.T., the dive was terminated, but the footage remains. The ship has since, dislodged and slipped over the shelf and descended to the ocean floor. No salvage attempts have been made to date.
