= Luling–Destrehan Ferry =

Coordinates: 29.93813°N 90.36015°W

- Locale: Luling and Destrehan, Louisiana, United States
- Waterway: Mississippi River
- Transit type: Ferry
- Operator: Louisiana Department of Highways, District 2
- Ended operation: October 1983 (with the opening of the Luling-Destrehan Bridge)

The Luling–Destrehan Ferry was a ferry across the Mississippi River in the U.S. state of Louisiana, connecting Luling and Destrehan. The ferry was one of three routes then operated by the Louisiana Department of Highways, District 2. The others were the pedestrian Taft–Norco Ferry and the vehicle Edgard–Reserve Ferry. The ferry ceased operation in October 1983 with the opening of the Luling-Destrehan Bridge.

== History ==
=== MV George Prince ferry disaster ===
The MV George Prince ferry disaster was a nautical disaster that occurred in the Mississippi River in St. Charles Parish, Louisiana, United States, on the morning of October 20, 1976. The Luling–Destrehan Ferry, George Prince, was struck by the Norwegian tanker SS Frosta. The ferry was crossing from Destrehan, Louisiana on the East Bank to Luling, Louisiana on the West Bank. Ninety-six passengers and crew were aboard the ferry when it was struck, and seventy-eight died.

== See also ==
- List of crossings of the Lower Mississippi River
