= Taft–Norco Ferry =

Coordinates: 30.0014°N 90.2439°W

The Taft–Norco Ferry was a pedestrian ferry across the Mississippi River in the U.S. state of Louisiana, connecting Taft and Norco. The ferry was one of three routes then operated by the Louisiana Department of Highways, District 2. The others were the vehicle Luling–Destrehan Ferry and the vehicle Edgard–Reserve Ferry.

== See also ==
- List of crossings of the Lower Mississippi River
