= Edgard–Reserve Ferry =

Coordinates: 30.049°N 90.555°W

The Edgard–Reserve Ferry was a ferry across the Mississippi River in the U.S. state of Louisiana, connecting Edgard and Reserve. The ferry was one of three routes then operated by the Louisiana Department of Highways, District 2. The others were the vehicle Luling–Destrehan Ferry and the pedestrian Taft–Norco Ferry. The ferry ceased operation on July 31, 2013.

== See also ==
- List of crossings of the Lower Mississippi River
