= MV Gullfoss =

Icelandic passenger and cargo ship

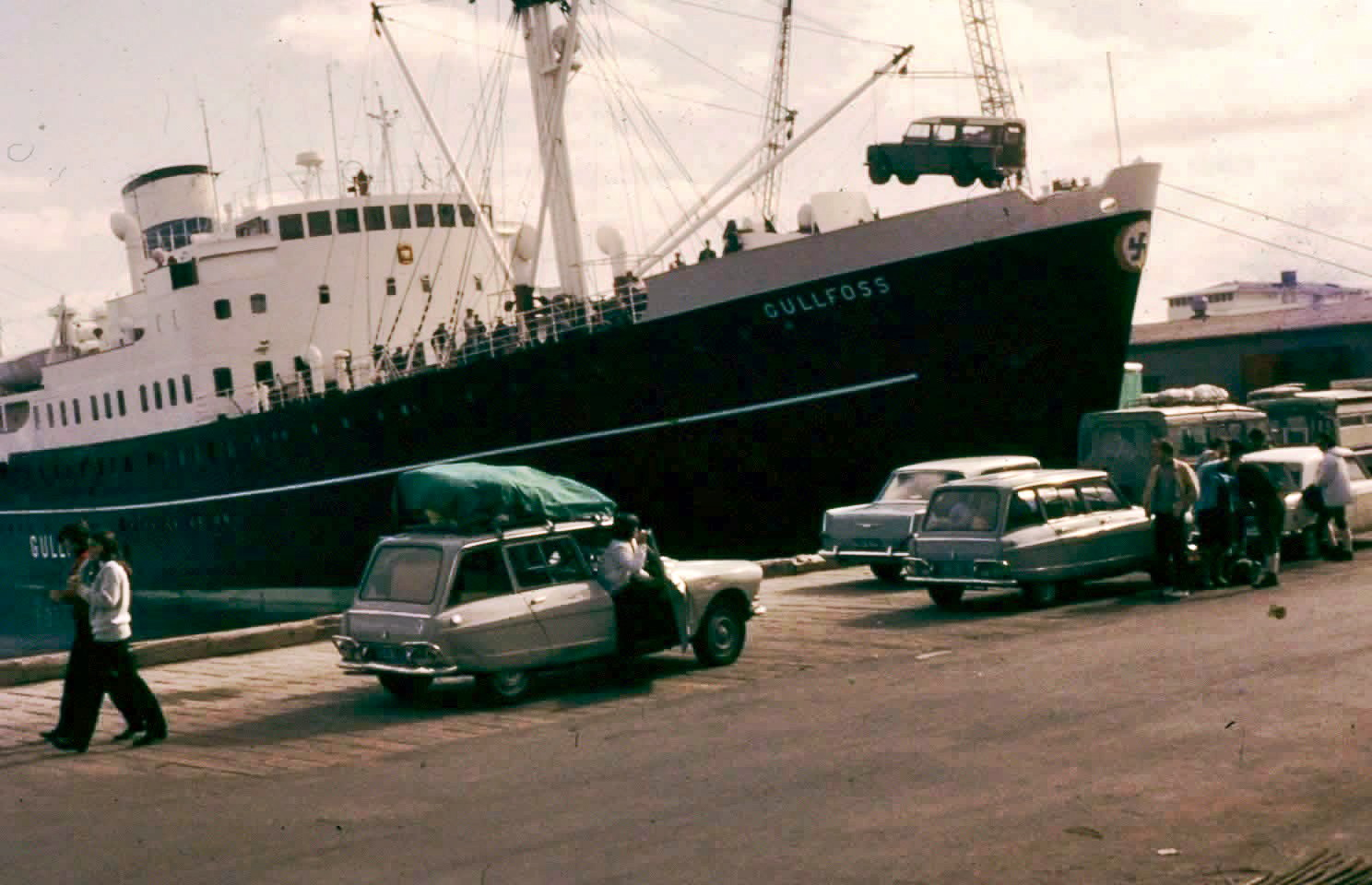
- MV Gullfoss unloading at Reykjavik in 1968

History

Iceland
- Name: MV Gullfoss
- Owner: Eimskipafelag Islands
- Operator: Eimskipafelag Islands
- Port of registry: Reykjavík
- Route: Reykjavik-Leith-Copenhagen-(winter only) Hamburg
- Builder: Burmeister & Wain, Copenhagen
- Yard number: 702
- Launched: 8 December 1949
- Maiden voyage: 14 May 1950
- In service: 1950
- Out of service: 1973
- Renamed: MV Mecca
- Home port: Reykjavík
- Identification: IMO number: 5138046
- Fate: Sank 1976

General characteristics
- Type: Passenger Steamer.
- Tonnage: 3,858Brt 1,850Dwt
- Length: 108.2 m (355 ft)
- Beam: 14.55 m (47.7 ft)
- Draught: 5.4 m (18 ft)
- Propulsion: 12 cyl, B&W diesel, 4025 hp
- Speed: 15.5 knots (17.8 mph)
- Capacity: Passenger: 209 (105 1st, 62 2nd and 44 3rd class)

MV Gullfoss was an Icelandic passenger and cargo ship operating between Iceland, Denmark, and Scotland from 1950 to 1972. She replaced another Gullfoss, both being named after the much-visited Gullfoss waterfall.

In 1939 Eimskip planned to replace the 1915 Gullfoss, but World War II intervened and the new ship was not launched until 8 December 1949.

Some days after launching, Gullfoss suffered a dust explosion, which killed four shipyard workers and injured two.

On 14 May 1950, she made her maiden voyage from Copenhagen, Denmark, carrying 164 passengers, arriving in Reykjavík, Iceland, on Saturday, 20 May, to a ministerial welcome.

During the 1950s and 1960s Gullfoss ran fortnightly in summer on the Copenhagen-Edinburgh/Leith-Reykjavik route and three-weekly in winter via Hamburg, West Germany. In winter she sometimes also became a cruise ship. In 1950 and 1951, Compagnie Générale Transatlantique chartered her for service from Bordeaux, France, to Casablanca, French Morocco. In 1953 she was in the Mediterranean and in 1967 she cruised from Iceland to the Azores, Madeira, Casablanca, and Lisbon. Several cruises went to Amsterdam and London and around Iceland.

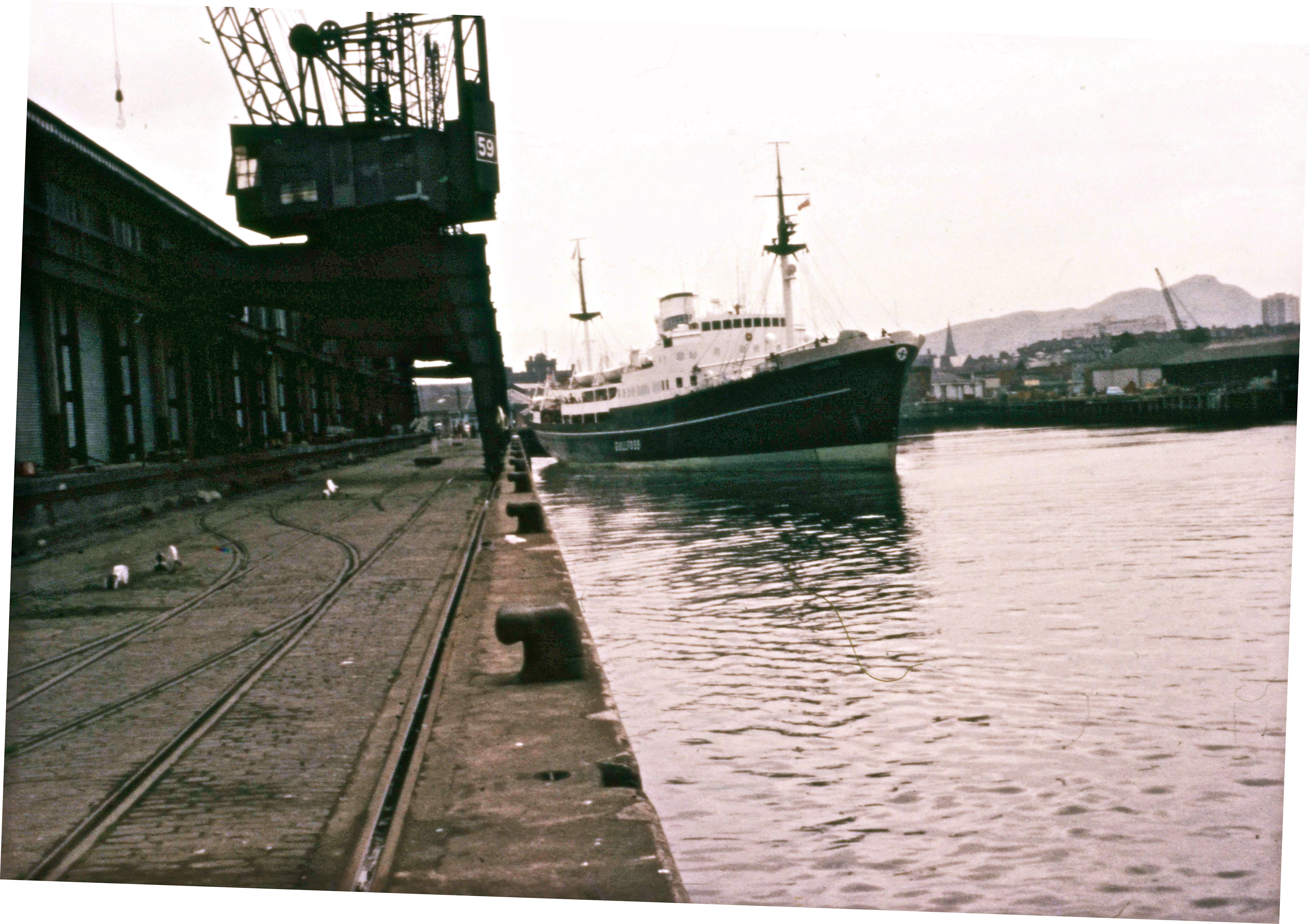
1968 Arthur's Seat and Leith Harbour

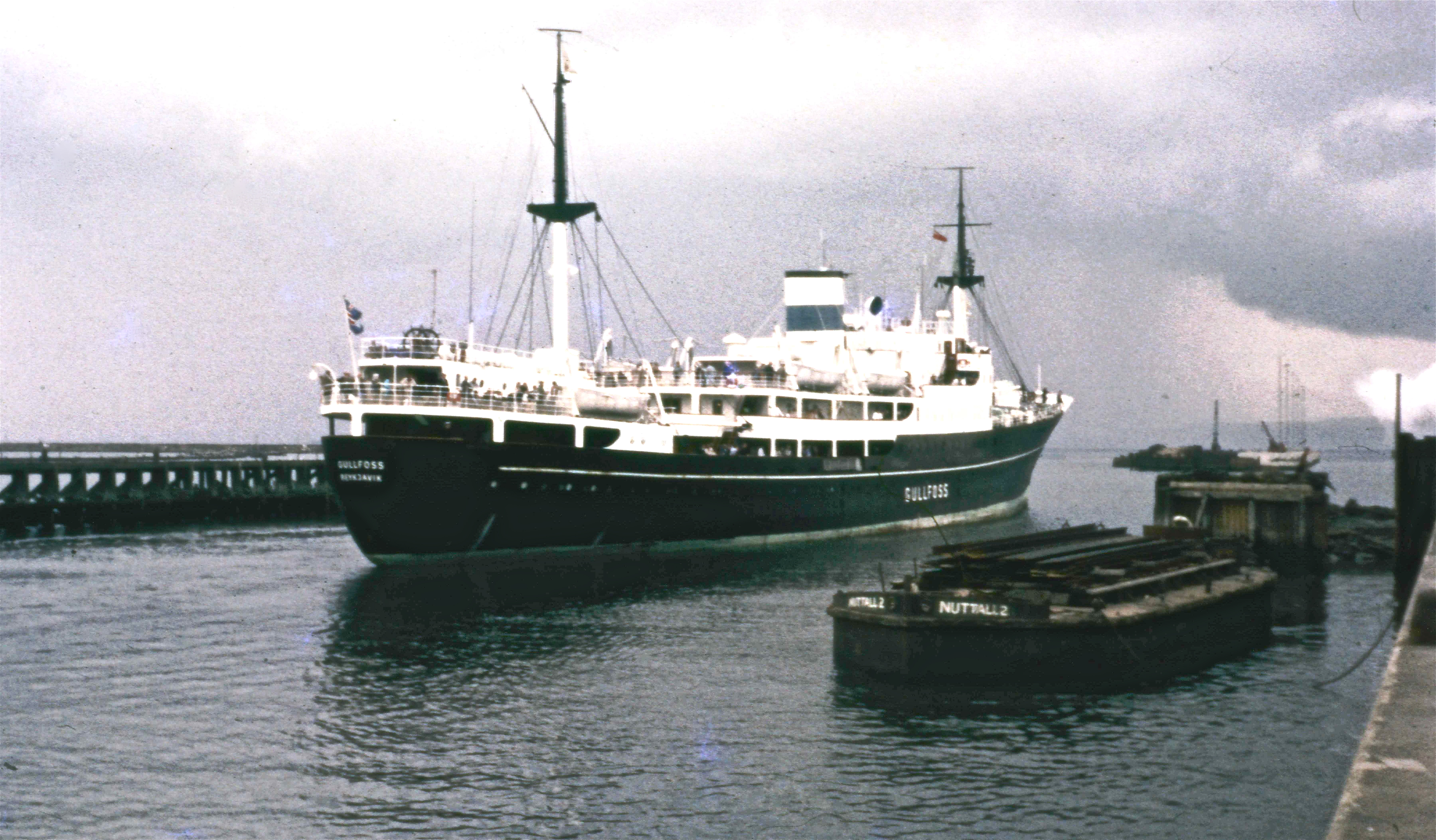
leaving Leith in 1968

In 1963, Gullfoss was damaged by fire whilst being inspected at her builder's yard and in 1966 she collided with MV Malmöhus near Copenhagen.

By the early 1970s Gullfoss operated only during the summer, and in 1972, owing to airline competition, she was temporarily laid up. During this period she evacuated Heimaey in the Vestmannaeyjar (Westman Islands) in January 1973 when the volcano Eldfell erupted. In May 1973 Gullfoss started her last regular voyage on the Reykjavik - Leith - Copenhagen route.

On 15 November 1973, Gullfoss was sold to Fouad A. Khayat & Co. (Orri Navigation Lines) of Jeddah, Saudi Arabia and renamed Mecca. After conversion in Hamburg to carry 1,100 pilgrims, she arrived in Jeddah in January 1974. On 31 January 1976 she was deployed on the 160 nmi (300 km) route encompassing Jeddah (the port for Mecca, 86 km (53 mi) away), Hodeidah, Yemen, and Port Sudan, Egypt until she caught fire in the Red Sea on 19 December 1976. All aboard were evacuated before the ship drifted onto a reef, then floated off, capsized and sank the next day.
