= Bertilia =

7th-century Frankish saint

Saint Bertilia

Virgin and martyr
- Born: unknown France
- Died: 687; France
- Venerated in: Roman Catholic Church
- Canonized: Pre-Congregation
- Feast: 3 January

Bertilia (death 687, also known as Bertilla) was a saint and virgin from Northern France.

Her parents were wealthy nobles. Bertilia, who was "very beautiful, gentle in speech, and modest in manner", turned "to the service of God alone" from an early age. Guthland, a young man also of noble birth, wanted to marry her, but she refused, wanting to live as a hermit instead, but her parents "urged her vehemently" and she agreed to marry him, anyway. She and Guthland, however, at her request, lived together in chastity, "as brother and sister", helping the poor and practicing hospitality. According to hagiographer Agnes Dunbar, "they spent their lives and fortunes in works of mercy and piety".

After her husband's death, Bertilia gave her property to the church, but reserved on small estate in, where she built a church in honor of Amandus, with a small adjoining cell for her residence, and a monastery in Artois. After a long day of prayer, she returned to her cell, where she died after being seized with terrible pain. She was buried at Artois. In 1081, Gerald II, the bishop of Cambray enshrined her remains to honor her as a saint; her relics were moved again in 1221 to Mareuil, where as of the early 1900s, were venerated. Dunbar reported that those seeking healing from blindness made pilgrimages to a fountain at Marceuil. Bertilia's feast day is January 3.

== Works cited ==
- Baring-Gould, Sabine (1877). The Lives of the Saints (1st ed.). London: J. Hodges.
