= SS Frosta =

Norwegian oil tanker, built in 1961

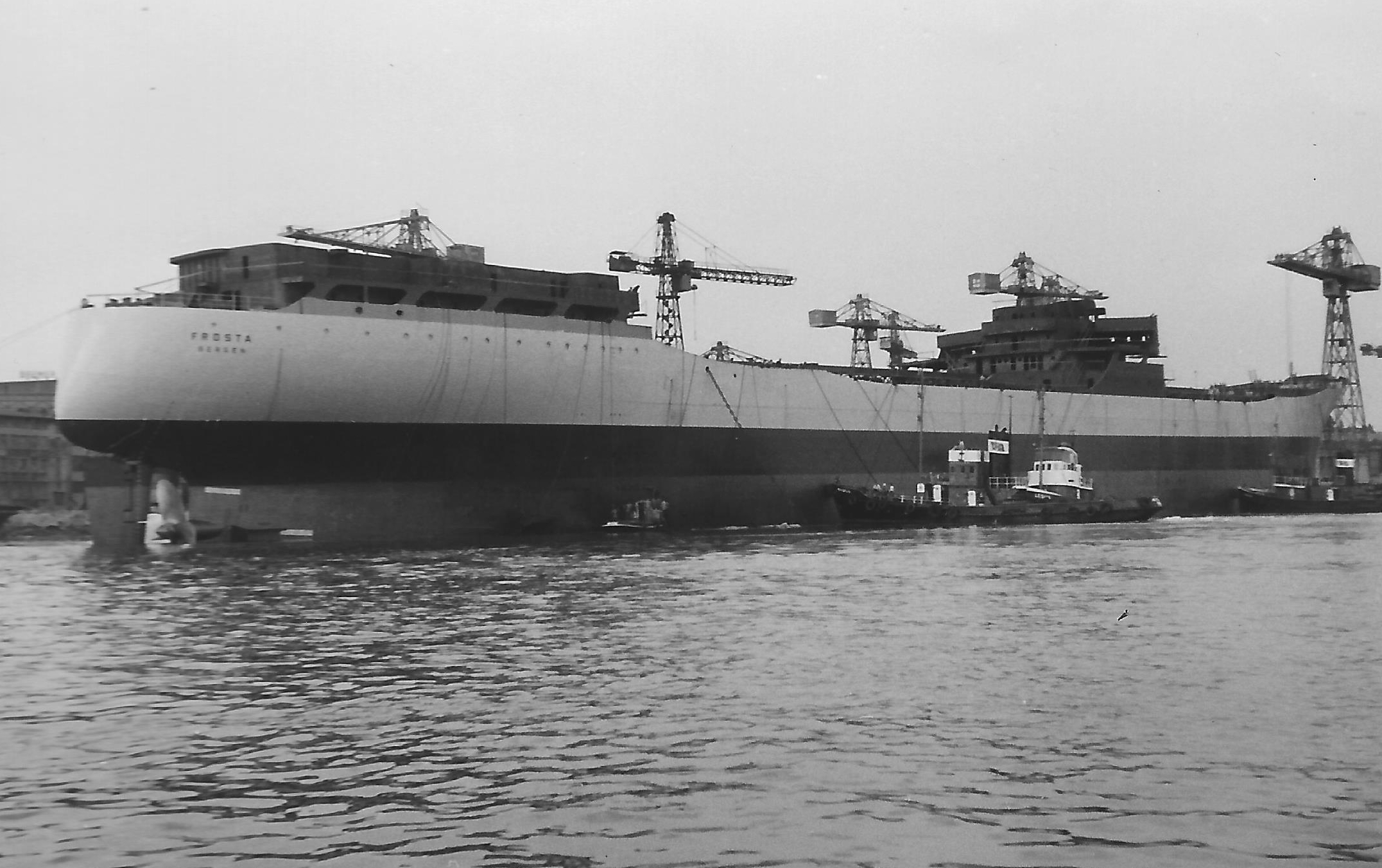
- Frosta at launch

History

Norway
- Namesake: Frosta Municipality, Norway
- Owner: James Carson
- Builder: Bremer Vulcan
- Launched: 27 July 1960
- Decommissioned: 1979
- In service: 1961
- Identification: IMO number: 5122023
- Fate: Scrapped 13 March 1979

General characteristics
- Type: Oil tanker
- Tonnage: 22,586 GRT; 36,010 DWT
- Length: 202 m (662 ft 9 in)
- Beam: 27 m (88 ft 7 in)
- Draught: 11.5 m (37.7 ft)
- Decks: 4
- Propulsion: steam turbine

SS Frosta was a Norwegian oil tanker, built in 1961 in West Germany by Bremer Vulcan and owned by A/S J. Ludwig Mowinckels Rederi of Bergen, Norway. The Frosta was 664.7 feet (202.6 m) in length, 89.9 feet (27.4 m) in breadth, with a 22,586 GRT, and powered by a steam turbine engine, rated at 16,000 horsepower (12,000 kW). It was rebuilt as a chemical tanker in 1971. It was sold for scrap in 1979.

== Ferry disaster ==
The MV George Prince ferry disaster occurred on the morning of 20 October 1976. The ferry George Prince was struck by the Frosta, which was traveling upriver on the Mississippi River. The ferry was crossing from Destrehan, Louisiana on the eastern bank to Luling, Louisiana on the western bank. Frosta was sailing from Rotterdam, the Netherlands, on 4 October, bound for Baton Rouge, Louisiana. Ninety-six passengers and crew were aboard the ferry when it was struck, and 78 people lost their lives.
