= October 1976 =

Month of 1976

<<	October 1976					>>
Su	Mo	Tu	We	Th	Fr	Sa
					1	2
3	4	5	6	7	8	9
10	11	12	13	14	15	16
17	18	19	20	21	22	23
24	25	26	27	28	29	30
31

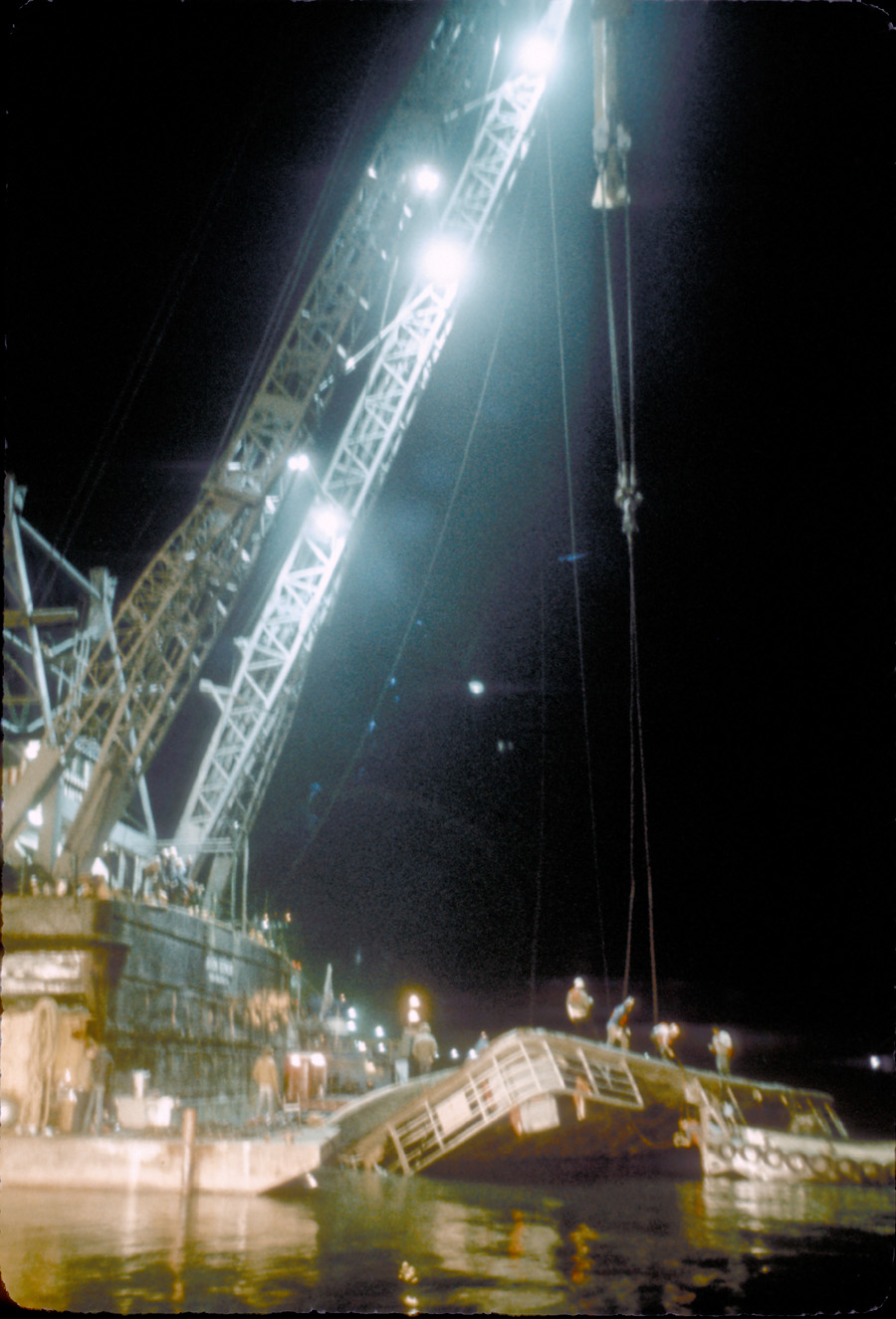
October 20, 1976: Seventy-eight people drown in U.S. ferryboat accident

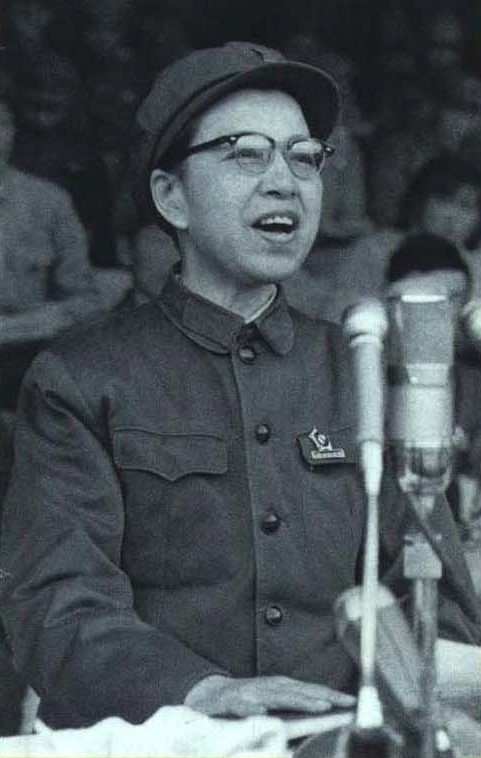
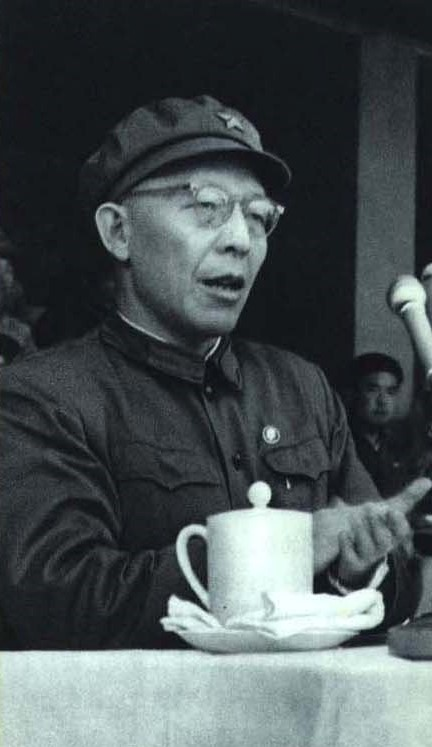
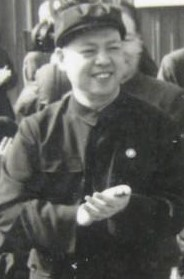
October 6, 1976: The Gang of Four (Jiang Qing, Zhang Chunqiao, Yao Wenyuan and Wang Hongwen) are arrested in China, bringing an end to the Cultural Revolution

The following events occurred in October 1976:

== October 1, 1976 (Friday) ==
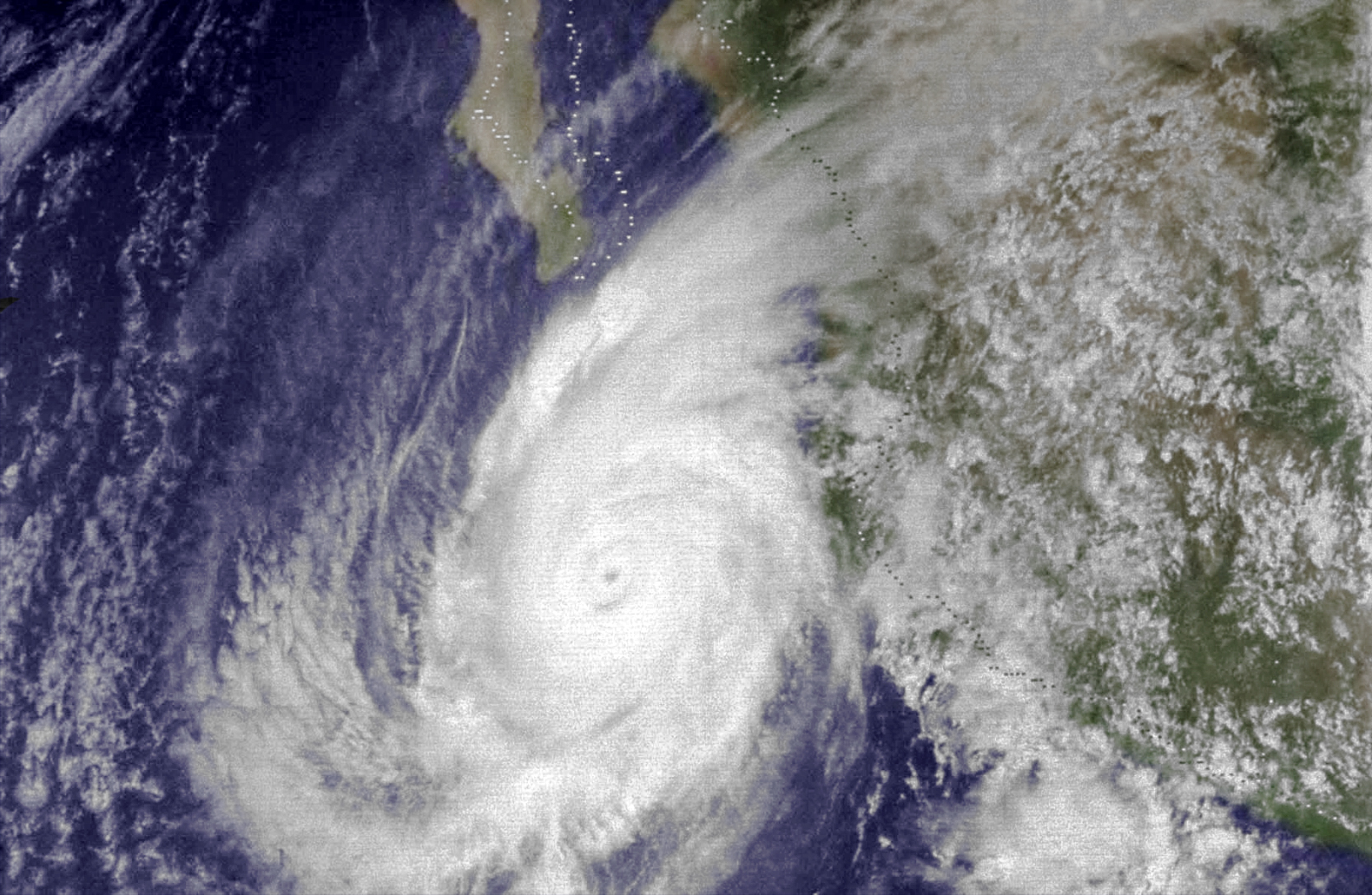
NOAA colorized photo of Liza

- Hurricane Liza killed more than 600 people in Mexico's Baja California Peninsula, striking the resort city of La Paz, Baja California Sur where 350 people died, and another 280 in the surrounding area.
- The U.S. state of California became the first in the United States to grant terminally ill hospital patients the right to the "living will", where they could opt to withdraw life-sustaining procedures if there was no hope of recovery. Governor Jerry Brown signed the bill into law after it had passed both houses of the California state legislature.
- U.S. Secretary of Agriculture Earl Butz was reprimanded by President Gerald Ford, after racist jokes and remarks that Butz had made against African-American people, were printed in the magazine New Times. Ford summoned Butz to the White House for "a rare public upbraiding of a Cabinet official" and Butz apologized to the lone black U.S. Senator, Edward Brooke. While most newspapers avoided quoting the joke directly, the statement was described as saying that black people wanted "only three things" and that "The things were listed, in order, in obscene, derogatory and scatological terms."
- The alcohol industry in the United States switched to the metric system in identifying the volume of liquor. Notably, the fifth, (1/5 of a U.S. gallon or 757 milliliters), was replaced by the 750 mL bottle and the pint bottle (1/8 of a gallon or 473 mL) was replaced by the 500 mL bottle.
- Born: Nasir al-Wuhayshi, Yemen-born terrorist and leader of al-Qaeda in the Arabian peninsula (killed in drone strike 2015)

== October 2, 1976 (Saturday) ==
- Argentina's President Jorge Rafael Videla narrowly escaped an assassination attempt by guerrillas who had planted a time-bomb beneath the reviewing stand at the heavily guarded Campo de Mayo Army Base near Buenos Aires. Videla reviewed a parade of the base's troops and made a speech to mark "Army Communications Day", then left the area to inspect a display at a nearby building. Five minutes after the ceremonies ended and the reviewing stand had emptied, the bomb exploded, destroying the stand and the area on which the president had been standing. General Videla, who had continued living on the base after being installed as president, had preceded a speech by the base commander, General Jose Catan, who told the assembled soldiers that the Argentine armed forces were winning the battle against left-wing opponents and said that "the guerrillas have given up trying to attack military bases," a few minutes before the bomb exploded.
- Danny Thompson, a shortstop for baseball's Texas Rangers, played his final game, after having played for four seasons with leukemia. He died on December 10.
- Born:
  - Anita Kulcsár, Hungarian women's handball national team line player; in Szerencs (d. 2005)
  - Alexander Sevastian, Russian-born Canadian accordionist; in Minsk, Byelorussian SSR, Soviet Union (d. 2018)
  - Mandisa, American singer (d. 2024)
- Died:
  - Mary Poonen Lukose, 90, Indian gynecologist and former Surgeon General of the Kingdom of Thiruvithamkoor (now part of Kerala state)
  - Gladys Leslie (stage name for Gladys Leslie Moore), 81, American silent film actress
  - R. C. Anderson, 93, English historian

== October 3, 1976 (Sunday) ==
- Voting was held in West Germany for the 496-seat Bundestag (which had 22 additional, non-voting delegates representing West Berlin). Although Chancellor Helmut Schmidt's Social Democratic Party (SDP) lost 16 seats and its coalition partner, the Free Democratic Party (FDP) lost two, the coalition retained a 253 to 243 majority over Helmut Kohl's CDU/CSU (Christian Democrats and Christian Socialists).
- Baseball's career home run champion at the time, Hank Aaron, appeared in his 3,298th and final major league baseball game, finishing with a hit that drove in one run for the Milwaukee Brewers in a 5 to 2 loss to the Detroit Tigers. The game took place at Milwaukee County Stadium where Aaron had spent most of his career for the Milwaukee Braves.
- Born: Seann William Scott, American film and TV actor; in Cottage Grove, Minnesota

== October 4, 1976 (Monday) ==
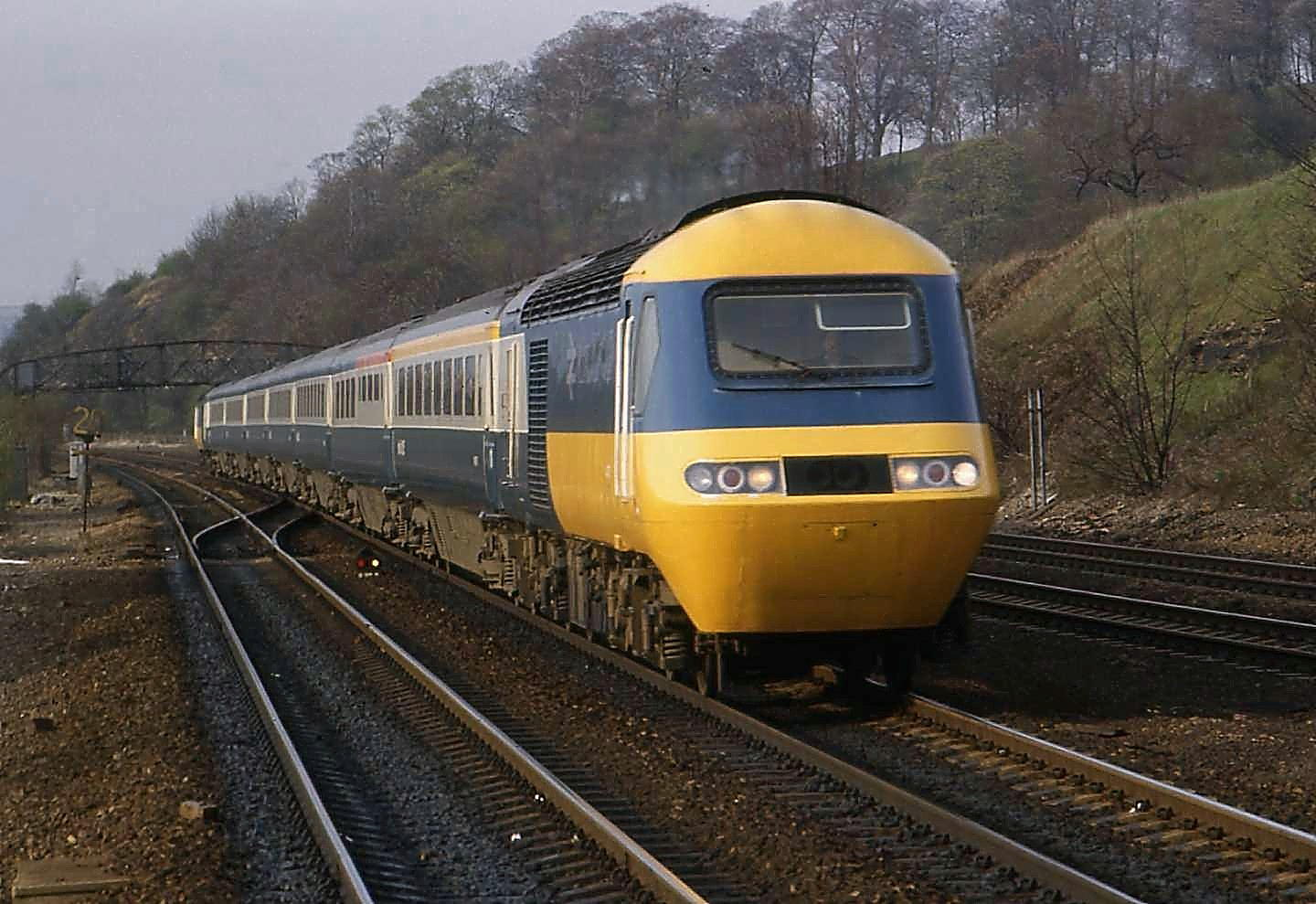
InterCity 125

- The InterCity 125 high-speed train, so-called because it had an average speed of 125 miles per hour (201 km/h), was introduced in the United Kingdom as the fastest railroad service in the UK up to that time. The inaugural high-speed trip from London's Paddington station departed at 8:05 in the morning to Bristol.

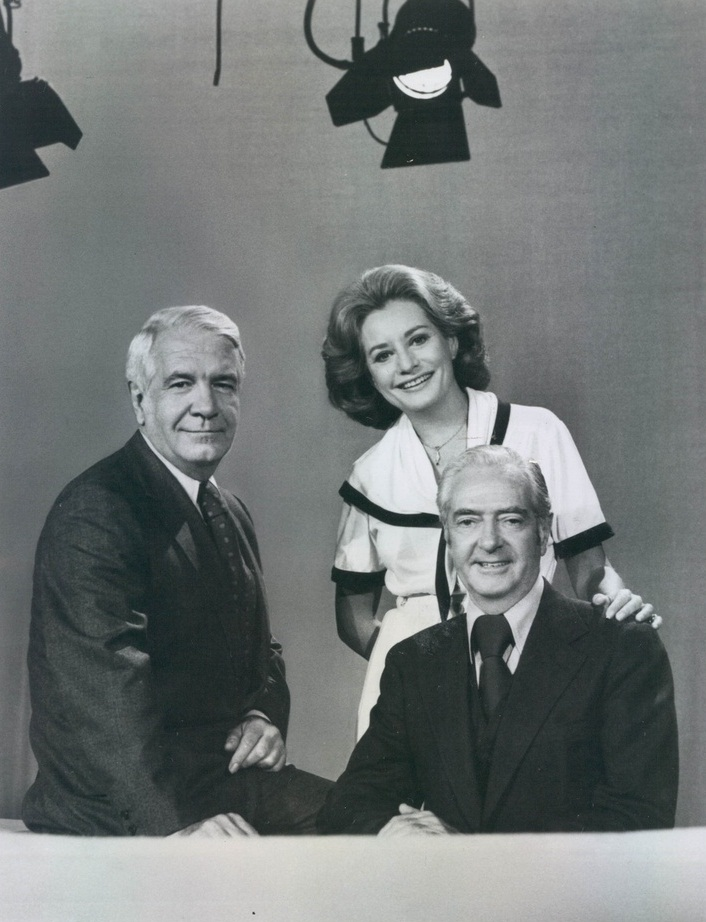
Reasoner, Walters and Smith

- Barbara Walters began work as the first evening national news anchor in the U.S., working with Harry Reasoner as the co-anchor of ABC World News Tonight, still referred to at the time as ABC Evening News.
- A group of three gunmen from the Basque terrorist organization ETA carried out the assassination of Juan María de Araluce Villar, his chauffeur, and three policemen in an escort vehicle, as he was departing his home in San Sebastián. Araluce, a 59-year-old Basque economist and one of the 17 "Counselors of the Realm", was killed along with the others by submachine gun fire.
- Earl Butz resigned as U.S. Secretary of Agriculture after both Democrat and Republican politicians called for his departure over racist remarks that he had made.
- The U.S. Supreme Court voted not to reconsider its July 2 decision in Gregg v. Georgia, clearing the way for individual states to carry out death sentences imposed since the original ruling.
- U.S. President Gerald Ford signed the Tax Reform Act of 1976, a bipartisan bill that lowered taxes on corporations and extended payroll tax reductions that had already been in place. The Act reduced the overall tax burden in the U.S. by $18 billion. In addition, it made assignment of social security number mandatory for U.S. citizens for identification for state and federal services.
- Born:
  - Alicia Silverstone, American film and TV actress; in San Francisco
  - Mauro Camoranesi, Argentine-born Italian soccer football midfielder; in Tandil
  - Ueli Steck, Swiss mountain climber; in Langnau im Emmental (killed in accident, 2017)

== October 5, 1976 (Tuesday) ==
- The United Auto Workers (UAW) entered into a new labor contract with the Ford Motor Company, three weeks after the UAW's 163,000 Ford Motor employees had gone on strike, in what was called "a 'toe in the door' to a four-day workweek in American industry" by labor analyst Arvid Jouppi, in that it provided for 11 of 52 weeks to have paid holidays in 1978 and 13 weeks by 1979 (seven new days off plus six holidays).
- Born:
  - Ramzan Kadyrov, Chechen rebel and leader of the breakaway Chechen Republic; in Tsentaroy, Chenceno-Ingush ASSR, Soviet Union (now Akhmat-Yurt, Chechnya)
  - Mauro Colagreco, Argentine-born French chef; in La Plata
  - Matt Hamill, deaf American college wrestling and later mixed martial arts champion; in Loveland, Ohio
  - Alessandra Sublet, French television host; in Lyon
- Died:
  - Lars Onsager, 72, Norwegian-born American chemist and 1968 Nobel Prize in Chemistry laureate
  - Barbara Nichols (stage name for Barbara Marie Nickerauer), 47, American character actress on stage, film and TV; from liver failure related to earlier auto accidents. She had been in a coma for more than a year.
  - Prabhu Lal Bhatnagar, 64, Indian mathematician for whom the Bhatnagar–Gross–Krook operator is named

== October 6, 1976 (Wednesday) ==
- One month after the death of Mao Zedong, the new Communist leadership placed "the Gang of Four" — Mao's widow Jiang Qing, Communist Party Deputy Chairman Wang Hongwen, Deputy Prime Minister Zhang Chunqiao, and the party's chief propaganda leader, Yao Wenyuan — under arrest, effectively bringing an end to the Cultural Revolution that had started ten years earlier in the People’s Republic of China. After two weeks without comment on rumors, the Chinese government confirmed the arrest of the group in the newspaper Jenmin Jih Pao. Confirmation of the arrest was not disclosed until the next day when the newspapers first quoted Chairman Hua Guofeng first referred to them as the Gang of Four. The cause of arrest was described in posters placed on walls in Beijing, which related that a gunman had shot at a convoy of cars earlier in the day in an attempt to assassinate Communist Party Chairman Hua Guofeng, and the gunman confessed that he had been hired by the widow of Chairman Mao.
- All 73 people on Cubana de Aviación Flight 455 were killed when a bomb, placed by anti-Fidel Castro terrorists, exploded after the plane took off from Bridgetown in Barbados. The DC-8 had been loaned to Cubana Airlines by Air Canada and was flying from Guyana to Cuba, with stops at Trinidad and Tobago, Barbados and Jamaica. At 2:30 in the afternoon, the pilot reported to the control tower that there had been an explosion on the plane and that he was attempting to return to Bridgetown, but plunged into the Caribbean Sea 11 miles (18 km) short of the return. Two men were arrested in Trinidad the next day after it was found that they had boarded Flight 455 at Trinidad, then got off the flight without luggage and flew back the same day. Hernan Ricardo and Freddy Lugo were both employees of a company in Venezuela, "Commercial Industrial Investigations", that was staffed by Cuban exiles. The Venezuelan government then arrested five of that company's staff on October 15.
- In Thailand, student protesters were killed by right-wing paramilitary troops and government forces at Thammasat University in Bangkok, while protesting the return of the nation’s former dictator, General Thanom Kittikachorn. The massacre led to the return of the military government.
- In San Francisco, during his second televised debate with Jimmy Carter, U.S. President Gerald Ford made a key error on national television when he declared that "There is no Soviet domination of Eastern Europe and there never will be under a Ford administration." At the time, the nations between West Germany and the Soviet Union were occupied by Soviet troops and under control of Communist regimes that followed the guidance of the U.S.S.R.'s Communist Party.
- Born:
  - Freddy García, Venezuelan baseball pitcher in the U.S. major leagues, 2001 American League ERA leader; in Caracas
  - Karen Dokhoyan, Armenian soccer football centre back with 48 appearances for the men's national team; in Yerevan, Armenian SSR, Soviet Union
- Died: Gilbert Ryle, 76, English philosopher, author of the 1949 book The Concept of Mind

== October 7, 1976 (Thursday) ==
- Militants fighting against the white-minority Rhodesian government bombed a railroad bridge just as a freight train carrying copper ore was passing over the Matetsi River. Two of the eight spans on the bridge were destroyed, but the two crew in the locomotive were uninjured, having made it to the other side of the bridge before the bomb went off.
- Born:
  - Marc Coma, Spanish rally racing motorcycle rider who won the Dakar Rally five times between 2006 and 2015, and the Fédération Internationale de Motocyclisme world championship six times between 2005 and 2014; in Avià
  - Gilberto Silva, Brazilian soccer football defender; in Lagoa da Prata, Minas Gerais state
  - Taylor Hicks, American singer, in Birmingham, Alabama

== October 8, 1976 (Friday) ==
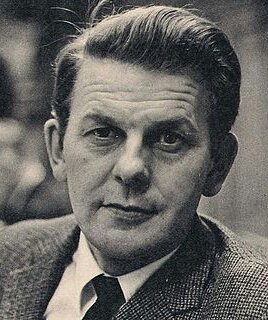
Prime Minister Fälldin

- Thorbjörn Fälldin replaced Olof Palme as Prime Minister of Sweden. Fälldin's cabinet had 20 members, five of whom were women including Foreign Minister Karin Söder.
- Thanin Kraivichien was appointed as the new Prime Minister of Thailand by King Bhumibol Adulyadej, with the concurrence of the military-controlled government. Kravichien had been serving as a justice on the nation's Supreme Court. Admiral Sangad Chaloryu, the leader of the military's Administrative Reform Council, announced the appointment and said that the military junta would step aside within two weeks in favor of a cabinet headed by Kraivichien. The transfer took place on October 22.
- Died: Eileen Gallagher, 89, Irish businesswoman and founder of Urney Chocolates

== October 9, 1976 (Saturday) ==
- Retired U.S. Air Force General Paul Tibbets, who had flown the B-29 bomber that had dropped the atomic bomb on Hiroshima in Japan on August 6, 1945, re-enacted the event as part of an airshow in Harlingen, Texas, leading to a protest by Japan's Ambassador to the United States and editorials in the U.S. condemning the show as being in poor taste. The three weekend shows had been sponsored by an organization that restored and preserved old airplanes, the "Confederate Air Force", which invited Tibbets to fly the restored B-29 and which arranged for a U.S. Army demolition team to set off "an atomic-bomb simulator, a barrel of explosives, sending a miniature mushroom-shaped cloud billowing skyward." Tibbets performed the re-enactment twice the next day. The United States government apologized to the Japanese Foreign Ministry five days later.
- Pittsburgh Pirates pitcher Bob Moose was killed in a car crash on his 29th birthday in Ohio.
- Born: Nick Swardson, American TV comedian and actor; in Minneapolis
- Died:
  - U.S. Army Lieutenant General Troy H. Middleton, 86, known for his decision to hold Bastogne during the Battle of the Bulge in World War II while commanding the VIII Corps.
  - U.S. Army Major General Charles H. Gerhardt, 81, controversial commander of the 29th Infantry Division during World War II during the Invasion of Normandy on D-Day, known for the high casualty rate in his Division.

== October 10, 1976 (Sunday) ==
- Hsieh Tung-min, governor at the time of the Taiwan Province of Nationalist China (and the future Vice President of the nation itself) was seriously injured by a letter bomb that had been hidden inside a book in the package. The explosive had been sent by Wang Sing-nan, a 35-year-old Taiwanese native and opponent of the ruling Kuomintang. Hsieh's left hand was amputated as a result of his injuries. Hsieh, leader of the Taiwan Provincial Government that encompassed 70 percent of the island, was the first Taiwanese native (as opposed to someone who had come to Taiwan from Mainland China after the Communist revolution in 1949). Wang was sentenced to life imprisonment but would be released in 1990, and would later serve as a leader of the Democratic Progressive Party in Taiwan's parliament, the Legislative Yuan.
- White South African rugby players Daniel "Cheeky" Watson and his brother, Valence Watson, defied South Africa's apartheid laws that prohibited mixed race sports teams, and played as teammates of the 13 black players on the KwaZakhele Rugby Union (KwaRU) team in a match against the South Eastern Districts Rugby Union (SEDRU) team. The next day, eight white rugby players participated with black players on two teams in a match at Port Elizabeth, leading South Africa's Minister of Sports, Piet Koornhof, to threaten prosecution.
- Born:
  - Bob Burnquist, Brazilian-born American skateboard champion; in Rio de Janeiro
  - Shane Doan, Canadian ice hockey right winger with 21 consecutive seasons for the NHL Phoenix Coyotes from 1996 to 2017
- Died: Silvana Armenulić, 37, and her sister Mirjana Bajraktarević, 25, popular Bosnian Yugoslavian singers, were killed in an automobile accident along with the conductor of the Radio Belgrade orchestra, Miodrag "Rade" Jašarević, 60. The three were traveling back to Belgrade from Aleksandrovac and were passing through the village of Kolari when Jašarević crashed into a truck coming the other direction.

== October 11, 1976 (Monday) ==
- The Toxic Substances Control Act of 1976 was signed into law by U.S. President Gerald Ford.

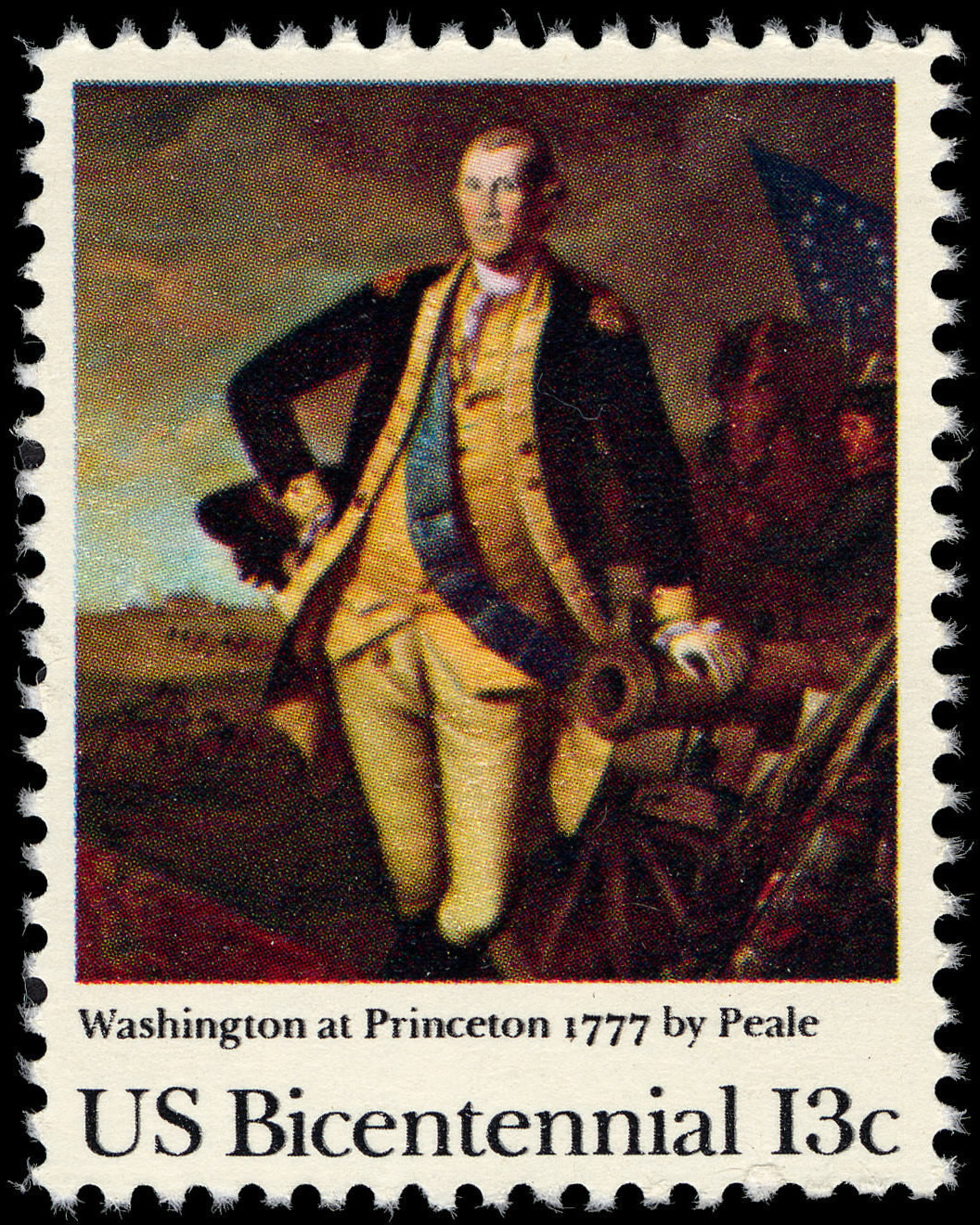
1976 General Washington stamp

- Legislation was signed by President Ford for a posthumous promotion of George Washington (who had died in 1799) to the highest military rank in U.S. history, General of the Armies. The U.S. Army would delay carrying out the law for almost 18 months, but on March 13, 1978, Washington's promotion was put into effect and backdated to July 4, 1976. The only other person with the rank, equivalent to a six-star general, was John J. Pershing, who was promoted on September 13, 1919, and held it as a retired officer until his death on July 15, 1948.
- The national TV career of Jane Pauley, at the time a 25-year-old newscaster for WMAQ-TV in Chicago, began as Pauley joined the newscasting team of NBC's Today show.
- Born:
  - Emily Deschanel, American TV actress; in Los Angeles
  - Sal Khan, American educator (Khan Academy), in Metairie, Louisiana
  - Julio Alberto Castillo Rodríguez, former Mexican drug lord; in Apatzingán, Michoacán state
- Died:
  - Masa Nakayama, 85, Japanese politician and the first woman to be appointed as a cabinet officer in Japan. She served for five months as the Minister of Health and Welfare in 1960.
  - Connee Boswell, 68, American singer popular in the 1920s and 1930s with her sisters Martha and Vet as part of The Boswell Sisters

== October 12, 1976 (Tuesday) ==
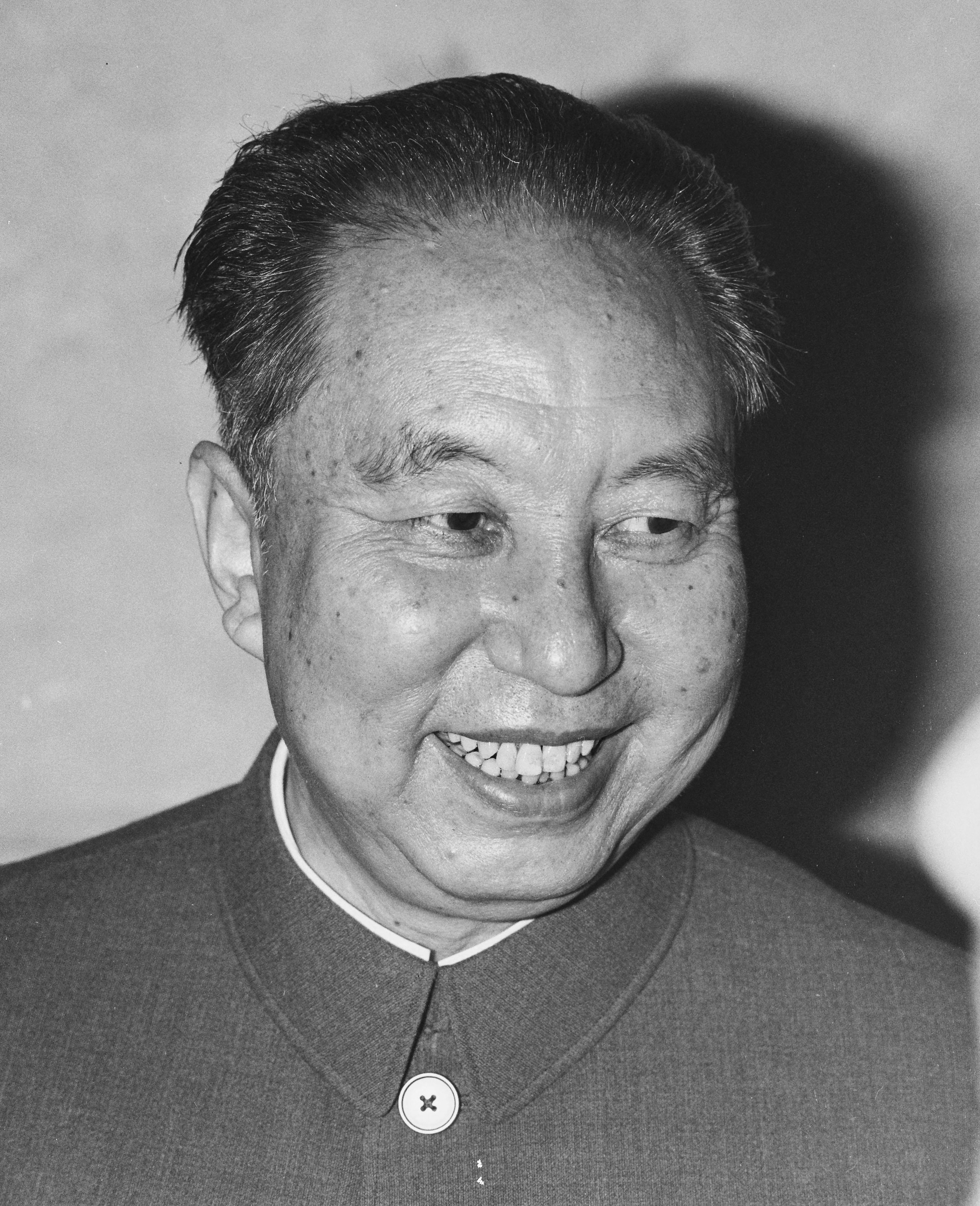
Chairman Hua

- The People's Republic of China announced that Prime Minister Hua Guofeng would be the successor to Mao Zedong as Chairman of the Chinese Communist Party, the most powerful position in China. Hua was also the chairman of the Military Commission that governed the armed forces of the world's most populous nation, giving him "a combination of authority that no other Chinese leader, including Mao", had ever held.
- All 95 people aboard Indian Airlines Flight 171 were killed when the Sud Aviation Caravelle jet crashed while attempting to make an emergency landing while trying to return to Mumbai (Bombay) after its number 2 engine failed. The flight had been bound for Chennai (Madras) with 89 passengers and six crew when a compressor disc failed, fuel lines were severed, and the engine caught fire and plunged to the ground seconds before it would have reached the runway. The flight data recorder was recovered by a fisherman who had found it in his net.

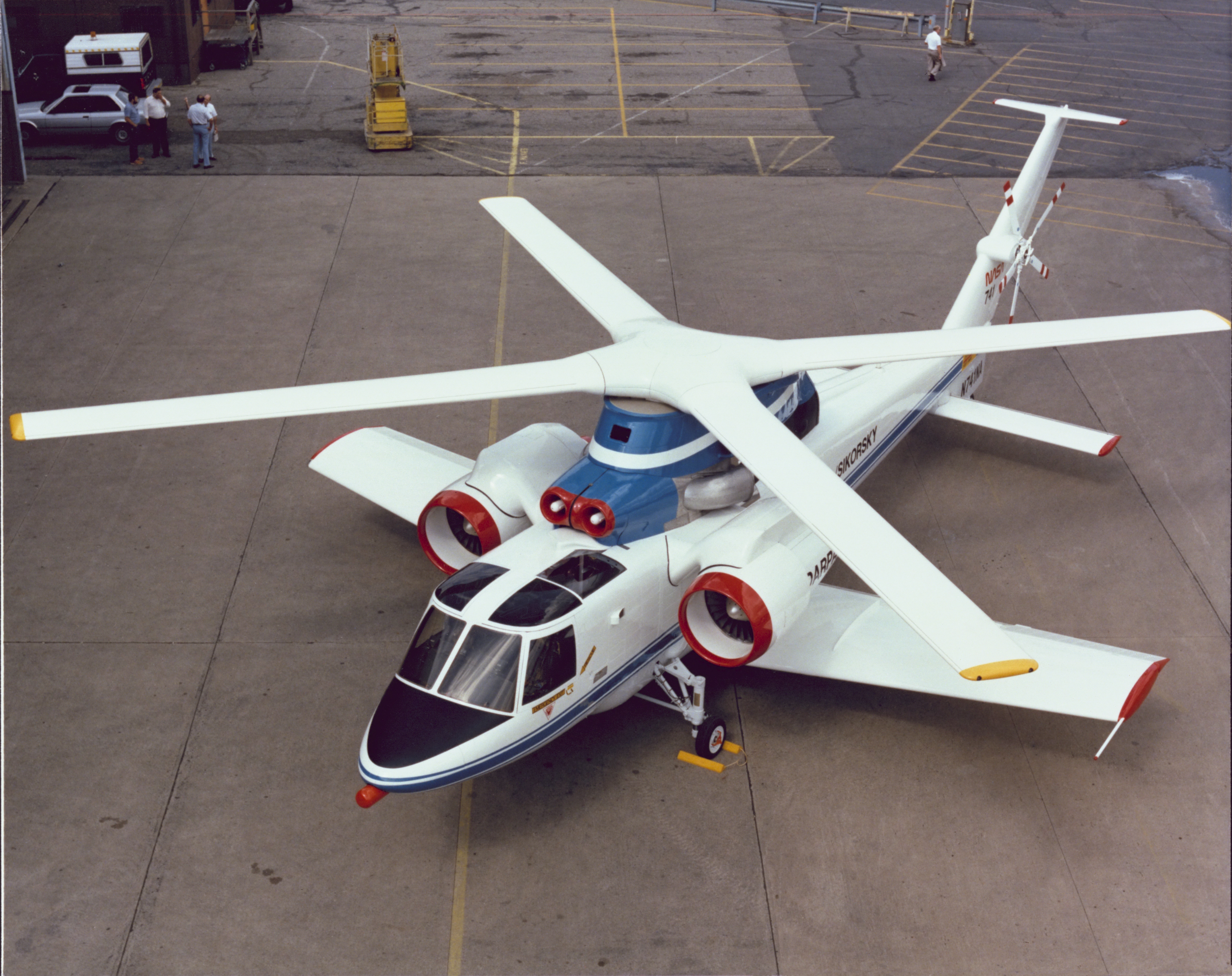
Sikorsky's "X-wing fighter"

- The experimental Sikorsky S-72, a combination of helicopter and fixed-wing airplane developed by NASA and the U.S. Army, made its first flight. The hybrid aircraft was not accepted for general use and only two were developed.
- Born:
  - Xulhaz Mannan, Bangladeshi journalist and gay rights activist; in Dhaka (murdered 2016)
  - Zazon (stage name for Élisabeth Castro), French actress and filmmaker; in Paris

== October 13, 1976 (Wednesday) ==
- Eighty-eight bystanders were killed when a Lloyd Aéreo Boliviano Boeing 707 crashed into a house, a school and a soccer field after failing to gain sufficient speed during its takeoff from Santa Cruz in Bolivia. A spokesman for the Bolivian Air Force said that most of the students had gone home for lunch but that at least 60 had remained inside the building. The jet, being used as a cargo plane and staffed by a crew of three, was returning to Miami after delivering livestock and clipped the tops of large trees 200 yards (180 m) from the end of the runway, "crashed through a line of people waiting to buy kerosene for cooking from a street vendor", gone through the school and through a field where two groups of students were practicing outside a local stadium for a soccer football game, then impacted the stadium wall, setting a fire in a locker room that caused eight students to die of asphyxiation. The impact came at 1:32 in the afternoon.
- The United States Commission on Civil Rights released the report, Puerto Ricans in the Continental United States: An Uncertain Future, providing documentation that Puerto Ricans in the United States had a poverty rate of 33 percent in 1974, up from 29 percent in 1970, the highest of all major ethnic minorities in the U.S. The study did not include Puerto Rico itself, which was a U.S. territory.

== October 14, 1976 (Thursday) ==
- The East German oil tanker Boehlen, carrying a cargo of 10,000 tons of Venezuelan crude oil, sank in a storm off of the coast of France, drowning 26 members of its 37-man crew. Afterwards, the French government would work for ten months to protect the Île de Sein, known for being a French beach resort and a major supplier of lobsters, from destruction. In an operation that cost US$30,000,000 and cost the lives of two divers and a soldier, France saved the island from continued pollution by pumping water into the wreckage, forcing its gradually-leaking oil from its ruptured tanks to the surface, and burning what was left.

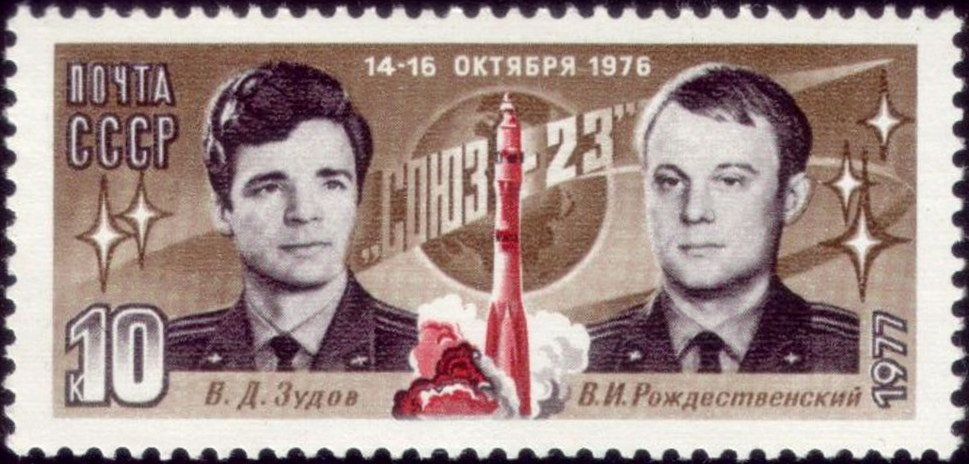
Zudov and Rozhdestvensky

- Soyuz 23, with Soviet cosmonauts Vyacheslav Zudov and Valery Rozhdestvensky, was launched from the Baikonur Cosmodrome at 17:39 UTC (10:39 p.m. local time) to dock with the Salyut 5 space station, but would be forced to return 48 hours later because it was unable to dock.
- Five hours later, the U.S. maritime communications satellites Marisat 3, second in the COMSAT series, was launched at 22:44 UTC (5:44 p.m. local time) from Cape Canaveral.
- Born:
  - Tillakaratne Dilshan, former batsman and captain of the Sri Lanka national cricket team; in Kalutara
  - Jayjay Helterbrand, Filipino-American basketball player and Philippine Basketball Association MVP in 2009; in Quezon City
- Died:
  - Edith Evans, 88, English stage and film actress
  - Suleiman Nabulsi, 68, who briefly served as Prime Minister of Jordan during 1956 and 1957

== October 15, 1976 (Friday) ==
- The Brazilian cargo ship Sylvia L. Ossa sank roughly 140 miles (230 km) west of Bermuda within the area of the Atlantic Ocean described as the Bermuda Triangle, with the loss of all 37 crew. An overturned lifeboat from the ship and an oil slick were the only traces of the sinking of the vessel, which had been transporting iron ore to Philadelphia in the United States.
- The two candidates for Vice President of the United States debated for the first time in American history, as Democrat Walter Mondale and Republican Bob Dole, U.S. Senators for Minnesota and Kansas respectively, faced off in Houston's Alley Theater in a nationally televised event. Both candidates would later lose in a U.S. presidential election (Mondale in 1984 and Dole in 1996) as would Gerald Ford (in 1976) and Jimmy Carter (in 1980).
- Born:
  - Minh Tuyet (stage name for Tran Thi Minh Tuyet), Vietnamese-born American pop singer known as "the Vietnamese Pop Princess"; in Ho Chi Minh City, Vietnam
  - Kamiar Rokni, Pakistani fashion designer; in Bahawalpur
- Died:
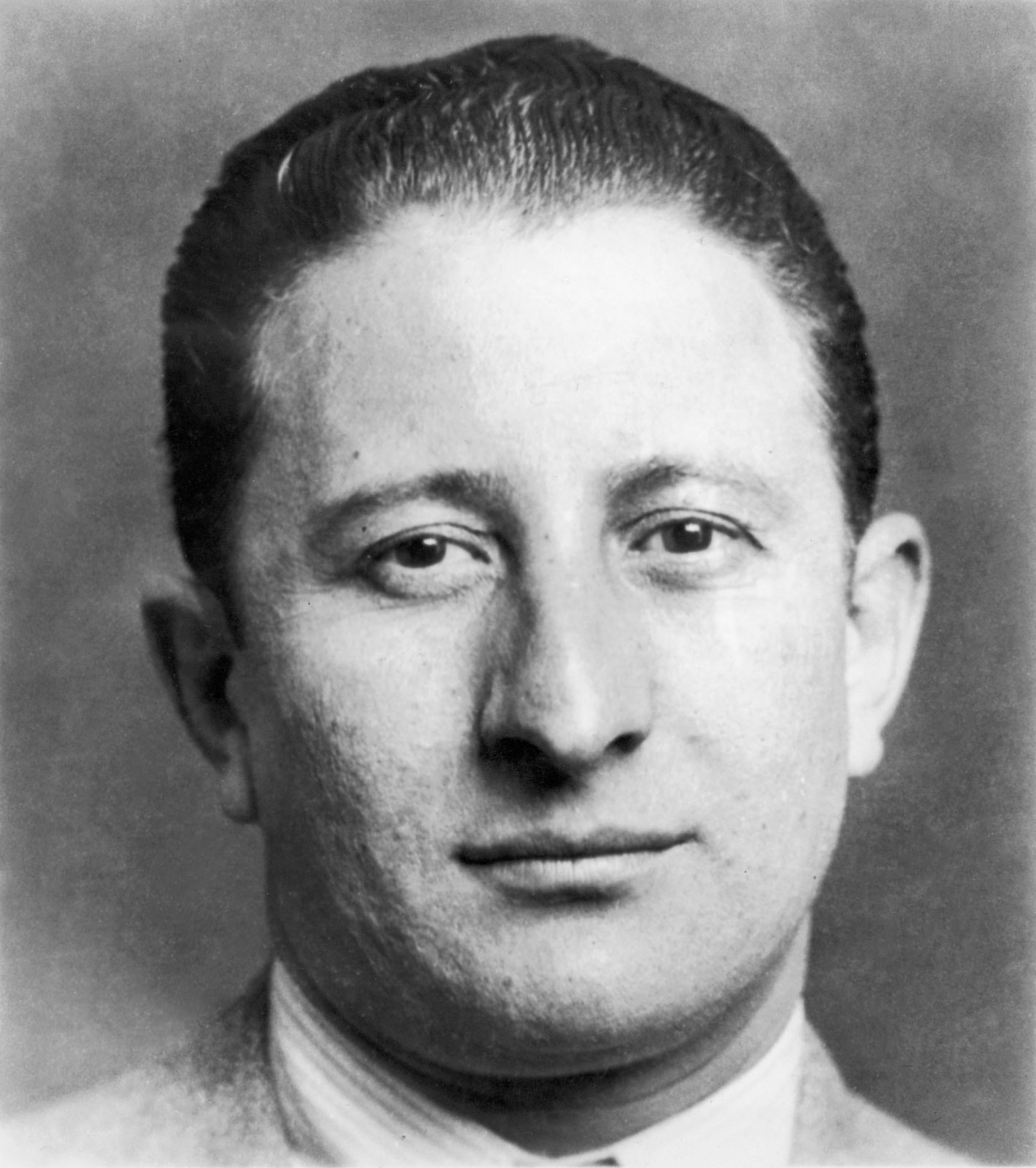
  Gambino
  - Carlo Gambino, 74, Italian-born American crime boss who led the Gambino family mob and from 1957 until his death, "The Commission" that coordinated the activities of the Five Families (Gambino, Bonnano, Colombo, Genovese and Luchesse) that controlled organized crime in New York City. His obituary in The New York Times described him as "the pre‐eminent figure in organized crime in the country" and said that "nothing in his appearance betrayed the immense power he reputedly wielded over organized crime in the United States", adding that his face "made him look like everybody's ideal of a kindly old uncle."
  - Erwin Lambert, 66, German building contractor and war criminal convicted of "aiding and abetting the murder of at least 300,000 people" for his construction of gas chambers and involuntary euthanasia centers at Treblinka extermination camp and other concentration camps
  - David Friedkin, 64, American scriptwriter and director for radio, film and television

== October 16, 1976 (Saturday) ==
- A ceasefire in the fighting in Lebanon, requested by the government of Saudi Arabia, went into effect after discussions with Syria's President Hafez al-Assad and the Palestinian Liberation Organization's Yasser Arafat.
- For the first time, crowds in the People's Republic of China demonstrated against Jiang Qing, the widow of Mao Zedong, who had died five weeks earlier. Protesters were seen in Shanghai carrying effigies of Madame Qing and three others who had orchestrated the purges of the Cultural Revolution— Zhang Chunqiao, Yao Wenyuan and Wang Hongwen, collectively described as the Gang of Four. The organized event appeared to signal "indications that China's new authorities were preparing a campaign to discredit the so-called leftist leaders."
- The Republic of Ireland's President, Cearbhall Ó Dálaigh, signed the Emergency Powers Bill into law after waiting for the Ireland Supreme Court to determine whether the law would be constitutional.
- Tony Franklin, a kicker for Texas A&M University, set a record for the longest field goal in modern college football history when he made a kick of 65 yards during a 24 to 0 win over Baylor. His achievement, made at 2:20 in the afternoon lasted only 20 minutes. At 2:40 p.m., Ove Johansson of Abilene Christian University kicked a 69-yard field goal at the homecoming game in a 17 to 0 win over visiting East Texas State. After 45 years, Johansson's distance has not been matched or surpassed.
- The Soviet space capsule from the Soyuz 23 made an emergency return to Earth after a malfunction prevented it from docking with the orbiting Salyut 5 space station, and made the first "splashdown" in Soviet crewed space flight history, coming down in Tengiz Lake in the Kazakh SSR at 8:46 Moscow time, only 48 hours after it had been launched into orbit. The two cosmonauts, Lieutenant Colonels Vyacheslav Zudov and Valery Rozhdestvensky both arrived safely. All other Soviet space missions returned to Earth by parachuting onto dry land.
- The Panamanian freighter Don Emilio was seized in U.S. territorial waters by the U.S. Coast Gauard cutter Sherman and found to have a cargo of narcotics estimated to be worth $134,000,000.
- Baseball's World Series opened in Cincinnati with the first game in which a National League team used the designated hitter, which had been in place in the American League since 1973. The Cincinnati Reds defeated the New York Yankees, 5 to 1, in Game 1 of the best-4-of-7 series. The Reds' Dan Driessen appeared as the first National League designated hitter.

== October 17, 1976 (Sunday) ==
- John Ogilvie of Scotland, a Jesuit martyr who had been hanged on March 10, 1615, for continuing to preach the Roman Catholic faith and for refusing to pledge allegiance to King James VI, was canonized by Pope Paul VI as a Roman Catholic saint. He remains the only post-Reformation Scottish saint in the Catholic Church.
- Voters in a referendum in the Philippines approved the extension of the 1972 declaration of martial law by a margin of 90% to 8 percent. Two amendments to the constitution were also approved to give President Ferdinand Marcos additional emergency powers.
- Voting was held in East Germany for the 500 seats of the Communist nation's parliament, the Volkskammer, from a list of 591 candidates. The representing the "National Front of the DDR", pre-approved by the nation's ruling Communist party, the Socialist Unity Party of Germany (Sozialistische Einheitspartei Deutschlands or SED, and ostensibly from nine political parties whose share of the allocated seats remained the same as the 1971 election. According to the East German news agency, 98.58 percent of East Germans participated in mandatory voting and, of those, 99.86% voted to approve the list of candidates.
- Dinkha Khanania, Metropolitan Bishop of Iran, was elected as the new Patriarch of the Assyrian Church of the East, an office vacant since 1973, and took on the regnal name of Dinkha IV. From 1980, when he fled to the United States, until his death in 2015, he would administer the Assyrian Church primarily from Chicago.

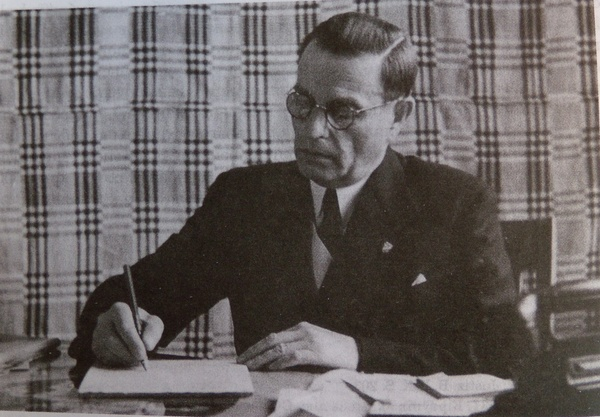
Astrouski

- Died:
  - Radaslau Astrouski, 88, Russian-born collaborator with the Nazis and President of the Belarusian Central Council in the puppet state of Weissrutheie (now Belarus) set up as part of the German occupation of Byelorussia during World War II. Astrouski, who oversaw the deportation of the Jewish population of Belarus, escaped after the Russian counter-invasion and was living in the U.S. at the time of his death.
  - Franz Altheim, 78, German historian

== October 18, 1976 (Monday) ==
- Police in the predominantly Muslim city of Muzaffarnagar, in Uttar Pradesh state, fired into a crowd of demonstrators protesting compulsory sterilization and Prime Minister Indira Gandhi's suspension of democracy in India, at least 25 people protesting against compulsory sterilization were killed when Uttar Pradesh police fired into the crowd.

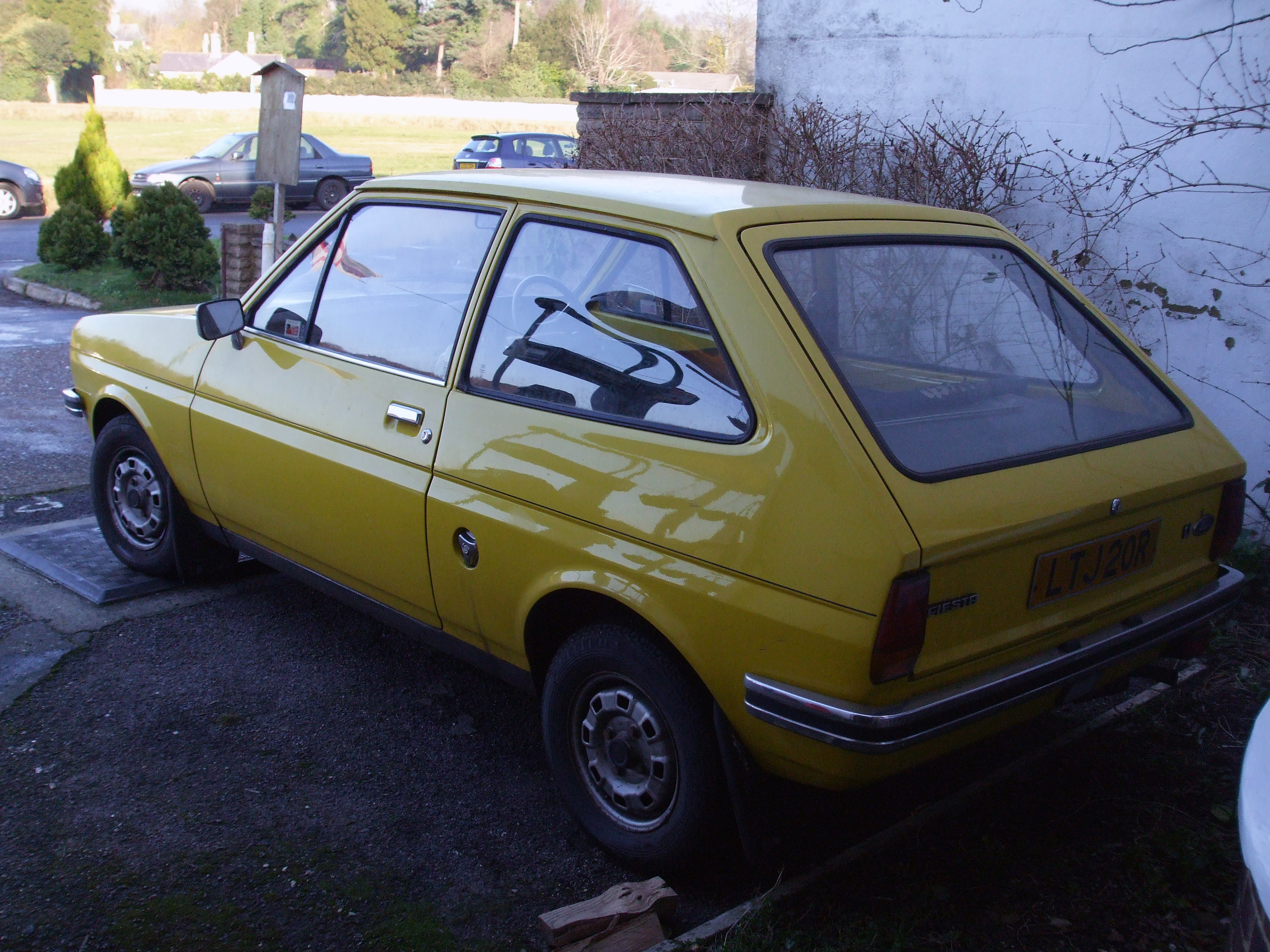
The '76 Ford Fiesta

- Ford Motor Company launched mass production of its smallest car up to that time, the high mileage Ford Fiesta, produced at its plant at Almussafes near Valencia in Spain.
- Police in Moscow arrested 13 Soviet Jewish dissidents, refuseniksor otkazniks who had spent five days in a "sit-in" protest at the reception room for the Communist Party Central Committee, transported them by bus to a location at the edge of the capital city, then released them. When the dissidents returned the next day, the bus drove them to a location more than 35 miles (56 km) from city limits, then beat them before letting them go. The occupation had taken place in an office that granted exit visas, which had been denied to the dissidents and their families, and began after the group was refused a request for a written statement of how long they would have to wait before they could leave the country. On October 25, Soviet authorities arrested 30 Jewish activists who had been planning to go into the Presidium of the Supreme Soviet, including physicist Mark Azbel, cyberneticists Victor Brailovsky and Alexander Lerner, and chess grandmaster Anatoly Shcharansky.
- Died:
  - Paul Schmidt, 78, German aeronautical engineer who helped develop the pulsejet for use in German V-1 missiles during World War II
  - Cardinal Giacomo Lercaro, 84, Italian Archbishop Emeritus of Bologna and cardinal within the Roman Catholic Church.
  - Count Ossie (stage name for Oswald Williams), 50, Jamaican band leader and Rastafari music drummer, was killed in an auto accident.

== October 19, 1976 (Tuesday) ==
- Twelve of the 15 crew on the Dutch freighter Gabriella died after abandoning the sinking ship in rough seas during a storm off the coast of Cape Race, Newfoundland in Canada. One survivor and eight crew who died from hypothermia were found in a life raft.
- The Copyright Act of 1976 extended copyright protection for an additional 19 years in the United States, and was the first major revision of U.S. copyright protection since 1909.
- The Battle of Aishiya was fought in Lebanon.
- The chimpanzee (Pan troglodytes) was placed on the list of the world’s endangered species.
- Born:
  - Desmond Harrington, American TV actor; in Savannah, Georgia
  - Michael Young, American baseball shortstop and 2005 American League batting champion; in Covina, California
  - Omar Gooding, American TV actor and comedian; in Los Angeles

== October 20, 1976 (Wednesday) ==
- Seventy-eight passengers and crew on the U.S. ferryboat MV George Prince were killed when the boat strayed into the path of the Norwegian oil tanker Frosta and was capsized. The collision occurred at 6:20 in the morning as the ferry was transporting workers, most of whom were in their vehicles with the windows rolled up, from Destrehan, Louisiana to the other side of the Mississippi River to their jobs in Luling. There were only 18 survivors. An autopsy on the ferryboat's captain, who was nearing the end of a long shift, showed him to have a blood alcohol content of 0.09 percent, slightly under the limit of legal intoxication under Louisiana law.
- Argentine soccer football star Diego Maradona made his professional debut at the age of 15, ten days before his 16th birthday, playing for the Argentinos Juniors of the top division of Argentine football, in a game against Talleres de Córdoba. He remains the youngest ever player in the Primera Division. On November 14, the future World Cup star scored his first professional goal in a game against the San Lorenzo team of Mar del Plata.
- Jean-Bédel Bokassa, President of the Central African Republic and raised a Roman Catholic, announced his conversion to Islam, changing his name to Salah Eddine Ahmed Bokassa. Forty-six days later, he would declare the republic to be a monarchy and proclaimed himself to be Emperor Bokassa the First of the Central African Empire.
- The Hartford Times, a 159-year-old evening newspaper that had been published in Hartford, Connecticut since 1817, put out its final issue, that included " its own front‐page obituary edged in black" and called the Times "a newspaper strangled by litigation" after its previous owner had sued the Gannett Company for fraud in the 1973 purchase of publication rights. At one time, the Times had the largest circulation of Hartford papers and almost twice as many subscribers as the rival Hartford Courant.
- Born:
  - Plamen Goranov, Bulgarian photographer and dissident, the first of six people who set themselves on fire to protest the regime in 2013; in Varna (d. 2013)
  - Somaya El Khashab, Egyptian actress and singer; in Alexandria
- Died:
  - Jane Duncan (pen name for Elizabeth Jane Cameron, 66, Scottish author of children's books, best known for her "My Friends" series of 19 books
  - Vladimir Kudashov, 58, Soviet war hero

== October 21, 1976 (Thursday) ==
- The defending champion Cincinnati Reds won baseball's World Series, completing a four-game sweep of the four-of-7 championship over the American League champion New York Yankees.
- NQ Vulpeculae, a nova visible in the constellation Vulpecula, was seen for the first time from Earth at 18:20 UTC from England by amateur astronomer George Alcock. With an estimated distance of at least 3,250 light years (995 parsecs), the Vulpeculae Nova would have occurred no later than 1275 BC.
- The sport of downhill mountain biking was first staged as competitors took part in a time trial in Fairfax, California. Alan Bonds, an artist who customized bicycles, had the fastest time of five people, completing the two-mile "Repack" descent in 5 minutes and 12 seconds.
- U.S. President Gerald Ford signed three bills into law on the same day. The Foreign Sovereign Immunities Act created new procedures and rights for civil and criminal suits against foreign nations in U.S. courts. The Federal Land Policy and Management Act of 1976 (which repealed all existing Homestead Acts including the century-old Kinkaid Act) provided new requirements for use of federally owned lands. Another measure authorized the residents of the United States Virgin Islands and of Guam to organize limited self-government and to create their own constitutions, to take effect within 60 days after submission unless the U.S. Congress objected.
- African-American activist H. Rap Brown, an advocate for the Black Power movement in the U.S. during the 1960s, was paroled from prison, where he had been serving a 15-year sentence for robbery and assault.
- Born:
  - Lavinia Miloșovici, Romanian gymnast and 1992 Olympic gold medalist; in Lugoj
  - Jeremy Miller, American TV actor known for Growing Pains; in Covina, California
  - Andrew Scott, Irish actor known for portraying Moriarty in the BBC series Sherlock; in Dublin
  - Josh Ritter, American songwriter; in Moscow, Idaho

== October 22, 1976 (Friday) ==
- Cearbhall Ó Dálaigh resigned as President of Ireland after being publicly insulted by Paddy Donegan, the Minister for Defense for his delay in signing legislation restoring a state of emergency within the Republic of Ireland, and after the Dáil Éireann, the lower house of Ireland's parliament had defeated a motion calling for Prime Minister Liam Cosgrave to fire Donegan. Specifically, Donegan had said on October 18 that the president was "a thundering disgrace", and the motion in the Dail failed, 58 to 63. New elections to replace Ó Dálaigh were set for November 24. Donegan would be demoted to the lesser post of Minister of Lands on December 2 by Prime Minister Liam Cosgrave, and replaced by Cosgrave who appointed himself as Defense Minister.
- Thailand's King Bhumibol Adulyadej approved a new civilian government to serve Prime Minister Thanin Kraivichien, dominated by the military and by right-wing politicians, including the first two women cabinet members in the kingdom's history. The king also signed a new constitution into law. Admiral Sangad Chaloryu, the chairman of the 24-member military junta that led the overthrow of Prime Minister Seni Pramoj, was named the Minister of Defense.

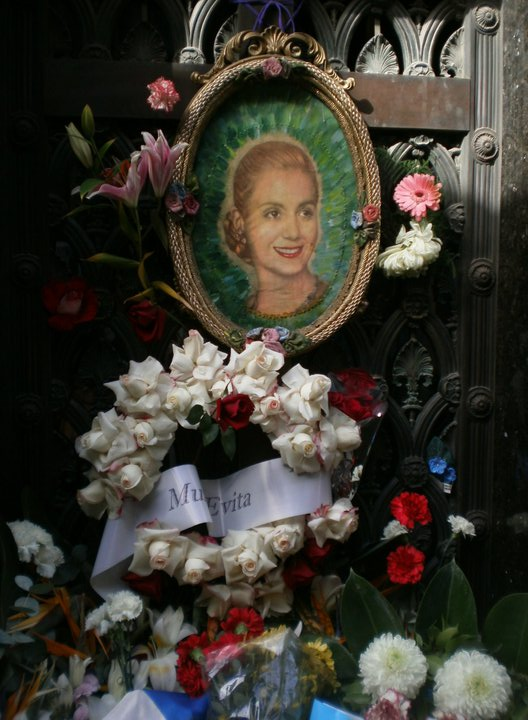
Evita's grave

- The body of Eva Peron, the beloved former First Lady of Argentina, was re-interred for the third and last time, 24 years after her death in 1952 from leukemia. Since 1973, when her husband Juan Peron returned to the presidency, she had been in a crypt at the Casa Rosada, the presidential residence in Olivos. Her body was moved to the Duarte family crypt in the La Recoleta Cemetery in Buenos Aires and placed in a steel-walled vault six meters (18 feet) underground.
- Eleven people were killed in an attack on the village of Shwenyaungbin in Burma by the Kachin Independence Army, a separatist terrorist organization.
- A rally of support for the arrested "Gang of Four" took place in the Chinese city of Yan'an in the Shanxi province, the last remaining area of China whose leaders supported the policies of the Cultural Revolution, with 40,000 participating.
- U.S. President Gerald Ford and Democrat challenger Jimmy Carter held their third, and final debate, held at the College of William and Mary in Williamsburg, Virginia.
- Born:
  - Jon Foreman, American Christian rock musician, in San Bernardino, California
  - Eric Spoto, American powerlifter, nicknamed the "Vanilla Gorilla", who broke the world-record in the bench press with a mark of 722 pounds (327 kg) in 2013; on Long Island, New York
  - Prem (screen name for (Kiran Kumar), Indian film director in Kannada cinema films; in Maddur, Karnataka state
- Died:
  - Alejandro Rodríguez de Valcárcel, 58, former President of the Spanish Parliament, the Cortes Españolas and briefly the head of state of Spain for five days after succeeding Francisco Franco as President of the Regency Council, died of a heart attack while at a doctor's appointment.
  - Richard Leibert, 73, American organist, radio personality and recording artist

== October 23, 1976 (Saturday) ==
- A total eclipse of the Sun took place over the south Indian Ocean and was visible in Tanzania, the Seychelles and the Australian state of New South Wales.
- Born:
  - Cat Deeley, English TV host and actress; in West Bromwich, West Midlands
  - Ryan Reynolds, Canadian film and TV actor; in Vancouver
- Died: Reverend Lakdasa De Mel, 74, the last Anglican Metropolitan of India, Pakistan, Burma and Ceylon

== October 24, 1976 (Sunday) ==
- A fire set by an arsonist killed 25 people (16 women and nine men) and injured 24 others at the Puerto Rican Social Club at 1003 Morris Avenue in the Bronx in New York City, after a fire broke out at 2:15 in the morning. The blaze, set in the only stairwell in the building spread within less than two minutes in the 1,000 square feet (93 m^{2}) dance hall at the club, and nearly all the victims were found at the windows at the front of the building, dead of asphyxiation. The door to the fire escape had been locked from the inside. Jose Angelo Cordero, who led the attack, and Hector Lopez, who ignited the fire, both pleaded guilty to murder and Francisco Mendez, who spread gasoline in the stairwell, was found guilty of 25 counts of murder.

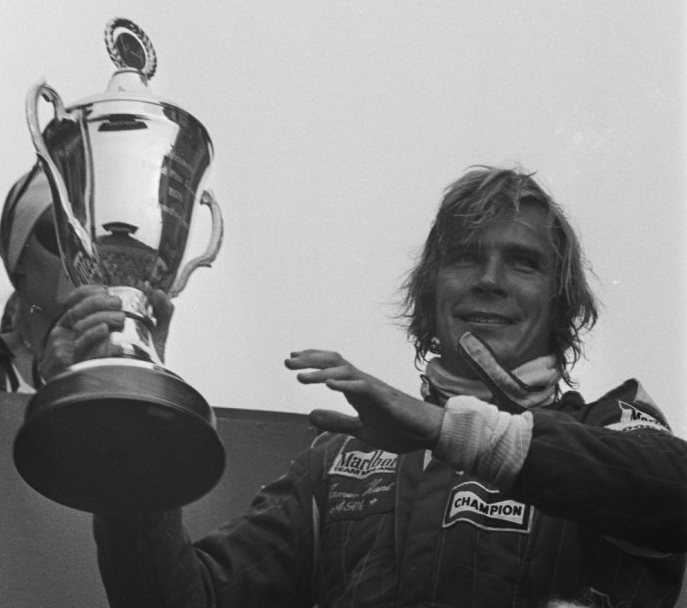
World champion Hunt

- Race car driver James Hunt of the United Kingdom won the Formula One World Championship by just one point when Niki Lauda of Austria was forced out of the Japanese Grand Prix— the 16th and final race of the season— because of heavy rain. Going into the race, Lauda had 68 points and Hunt had 66; the next highest competitor, Jody Scheckter of South Africa, had only 49 points and was mathematically eliminated from the championship. Hunt finished in third place at the Fuji Speedway, earning 3 points. Because of weather conditions that had left the track wet, the organizers debated whether to run as scheduled or to postpone the race to the next day. After the race started, four of the drivers withdrew, including Lauda, who quit after two laps and later commented, "my life is worth more than a title." Down 66 to 68, Hunt needed to finish at least in 4th place (for 2 points) to be co-champion; his third-place finish gave him 3 points for the 69 to 68 victory.
- Hua Guofeng was formally acclaimed as the Chairman of the Chinese Communist Party (CCP) and successor to Mao Zedong, who had died on September 7. The announcement was made in the Party's newspaper Jenmin Jih Pao and Chinese army newspaper Chiehfang Jih Pao, and reported that the decision had been made by the party's Politburo on October 7.
- Born: Mallika Sherawat (stage name for Reema Lamba), popular Indian Bollywood film actress; in Moth Rangran, Haryana state

== October 25, 1976 (Monday) ==
- Universal Studios and the Walt Disney Company filed a lawsuit in the federal court in California against the Sony Corporation of America to prohibit the sale of Sony's videocassette recording system, the Betamax, and seeking a ruling that would bar video recording in general for the general public. The case would eventually be decided by the U.S. Supreme Court in favor of Sony, and for video recording of television programs in general, in 1984.
- The University of Ilorin, commonly referred to in Nigeria as Unilorin, began its first classes, serving 200 undergraduate students in the city of Ilorin in Kwara State. Within 30 years, Unilorin would have more than 20,000 students and as of 45 years later, 48,000 undergraduates.
- All 32 passengers and crew on a 34-year-old Colombian DC-3 propeller plane were killed when a Taxi Aéreo El Venado flight crashed one minute after takeoff from Yopal with an intended destination of Cúcuta.
- Clarence Norris, the last known survivor of the nine Scottsboro Boys, was pardoned by Alabama Governor George C. Wallace. After spending five years on death row and 15 years total in prison for a crime he had not committed, Norris was paroled in 1946 and left Alabama without permission. On November 29, 1976, Norris, a warehouse employee for the government of New York City, returned to Alabama for the first time since 1946 and accepted the pardon.
- Born: Anton Sikharulidze, Russian pairs figure skater, 2002 Olympic gold medalist and 1998 and 1999 world champion with partner Elena Berezhnaya; in Leningrad, RSFSR, Soviet Union (now Saint Petersburg, Russia)
- Died:
  - Raymond Queneau, 73, French humorist and novelist
  - Antonin Raymond, 88, Czech-American architect

== October 26, 1976 (Tuesday) ==
Transkei location

- Transkei, a poor section on the coast of South Africa created for the relocation of black African members of the white-minority ruled nation’s Xhosa people, was declared an independent nation. Kaiser Matanzima, the new Prime Minister of Transkei, accepted the documents of independence from South Africa's President Nicolaas Diederichs in a ceremony at the Transkeian capital, Umtata. Botha Sigcau was appointed as the nominal President of Transkei. The legitimacy of Transkei, the first bantustan or "black homeland" to be set aside for black majority rule, was not recognized by the rest of the world. The United Nations General Assembly voted unanimously (134 to 0) to request member nations not to deal with Transkei, with one vote of abstention by the United States, which had already stated that it would not recognize Transkei. Transkei and the three other bantustans would cease to exist on April 27, 1994, when South Africa's new constitution took effect to institute democratic rule with a black majority government.
- The Soviet Union launched Ekran, its first geosynchronous satellite, to permit direct satellite television.
- Law enforcement officers from the sheriff's department in Catoosa County, Georgia, killed five of seven lions (six females and one male) who had been set free by a vandal from a private zoo near Ringgold, Georgia, the night before. During their rampage, the lions "killed four dogs, a cow and a pet wolf". One was recaptured, while another, a 400 lb (180 kg) lioness, remained free until the next day, when it was killed while charging at one of the deputies.
- Born:
  - Jeremy Wotherspoon, Canadian speed skater, world champion in spring skating 1999, 2000, 2002 and 2003, and in the 500 meter world championship in 2003, 2004 and 2008; in Humboldt, Saskatchewan
  - Florence Kasumba, Ugandan-born actress; in Kampala
- Died:
  - Aldo Vera Serafin, 43, Cuban exile and former director of intelligence for the Cuban police agency, was killed in a drive by shooting while walking on a sidewalk in San Juan, Puerto Rico,
  - Arrigo Benedetti, 66, Italian journalist and news magazine editor

== October 27, 1976 (Wednesday) ==
- Carnegie-Mellon University (C.M.U.) of Pittsburgh announced that an alumnus of the institution, who requested to remain anonymous, had made a donation of $35,000,000 to be payable upon his death and the death of his wife. In addition to being the largest donation ever to C.M.U., the gift was the second largest by an individual to any university, exceeded only by a $50,000,000 donation made to the University of Virginia.
- Former U.S. Senator Edward Gurney of Florida was acquitted by a jury on all charges of having lied to a grand jury about his knowledge of a scheme by his employees to collect $400,000 of donations from construction companies in return for favors from the Federal Housing Administration. Senator Gurney, who had resigned at the end of 1974 after being identified in the scandal, had been acquitted in 1975 on charges of perjury and conspiracy.
- Albert Muwalo, Chairman of the ruling Congress Party and a Minister without Portfolio in the southern African nation of Malawi, was arrested on charges of corruption on orders of Malawi's President Hastings Banda.

== October 28, 1976 (Thursday) ==
- The first democratic elections in Egypt in almost 25 years began with 1,660 candidates competing for the 347 seats in the People's Assembly, although candidates still had to be approved by the government. Runoff elections were held on November 4 for those races where no candidate received a majority of the vote.
- The white-minority government of South Africa lifted its ban against Ebony magazine, the monthly U.S. periodical for African-Americans.
- Born: Xia Yu, Chinese film actor; in Qingdao, Shandong province
- Died:
  - Máire Drumm, 57, former vice president for the Northern Ireland branch of Sinn Féin, was shot to death by Ulster Defense Regiment terrorists in Belfast while she was laying in bed in the Mater Infirmorum Hospital. She was recovering in bed in the Roman Catholic hospital in the capital of Northern Ireland, three weeks after having had eye surgery.
  - Cherukad Govinda Pisharodi, 62, Indian Malayalam language novelist and playwright
  - Aarne Juutilainen, 72, Finnish military officer and hero of the Battle of Kollaa during the Talvisota, the war between Finland and the Soviet Union.

== October 29, 1976 (Friday) ==
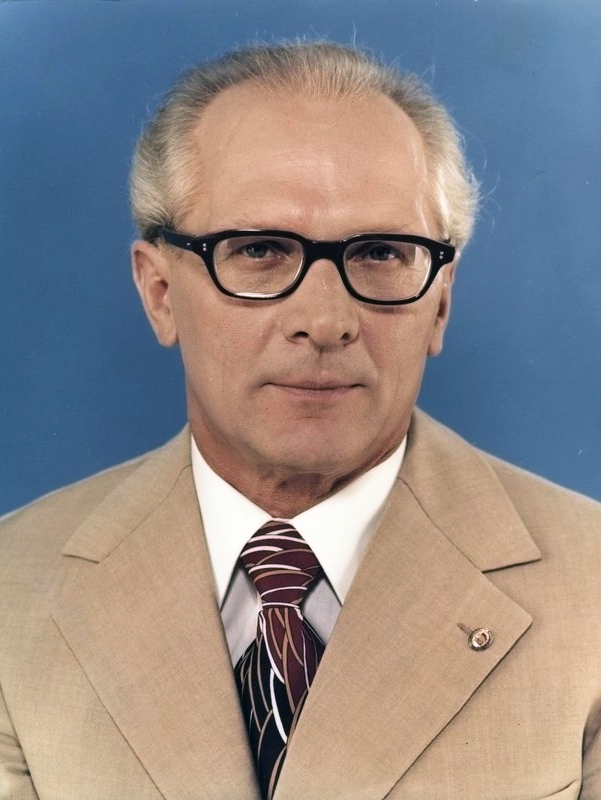
Honecker

- Erich Honecker, the Communist General Secretary of East Germany's Socialist Unity Party (SED) and commander of the nation's armed forces, was elected unanimously by the 500-member Volkskammer to the position of Chairman of the State Council, equivalent to the head of state. Honecker replaced Willi Stoph, who was moved to the position of Chairman of the Council of Ministers.
- Born:
  - Stephen Craigan, Northern Ireland soccer football defender; in Newtownards, County Down
  - Glenn Berggoetz, American comedian and film producer known for the 2011 film The Worst Movie Ever! and for the 2010 comedy To Die Is Hard; in Atlantic City, New Jersey
- Died: Konstantin Vasilyev, 33, Soviet Russian painter, was killed in a railway accident.

== October 30, 1976 (Saturday) ==
- India's Prime Minister Indira Gandhi postponed democratic elections that had been scheduled for March 1977 for the 525-member Lok Sabha, the lower house of India's parliament. Law and Justice Minister H. R. Gokhale informed Lok Sabha members that their 5-year terms, which had already been extended for one year with the cancellation of voting set for March 1976, would be extended to seven years and that voting would not take place before March 1978.
- The Montreal Canadiens had their lone loss at home during the 1976–77 NHL season, falling 4 to 3 to the Boston Bruins. They would finish the regular season with a record of 60 wins, 8 losses and 12 ties (60-8-12) and lost only one home game, winning 33 other with six ties. They would lose Game 5 of the NHL playoff semifinals at home, falling to the New York Islanders, 4 to 3, in overtime on May 5, 1977.
- The television show Mr. T and Tina, starring Pat Morita in the first U.S. TV show to feature a mostly Asian-American cast, was canceled after its sixth show.
- A deer hunter in Utah discovered the wreckage of a Piper Tri-Pacer airplane that had vanished on March 27, 1963, 13 years earlier. The small airplane and the remains of Harry Ross Jr and UFO researcher Wallace C. Halsey, had crashed into a mountainside near St. George, Utah.
- Born: Stern John, Trinidanian footballer with 115 caps and 70 goals for the Trinidad and Tobago national team; in Tunapuna
- Died:
  - Alfred Landé, 87, German-born American physicist known for his contributions to quantum theory. He is responsible for the Landé g-factor and an explanation of the Zeeman effect.
  - Sa'id Hormozi, 79, Iranian musician who preserved the radif genre of music.
  - Daniel Bonade, 80, French clarinet player and composer
  - Julio Just Gimeno, 82, Spanish politician former Minister of Public Works until his 1937 ouster following the Spanish Civil War.

== October 31, 1976 (Sunday) ==
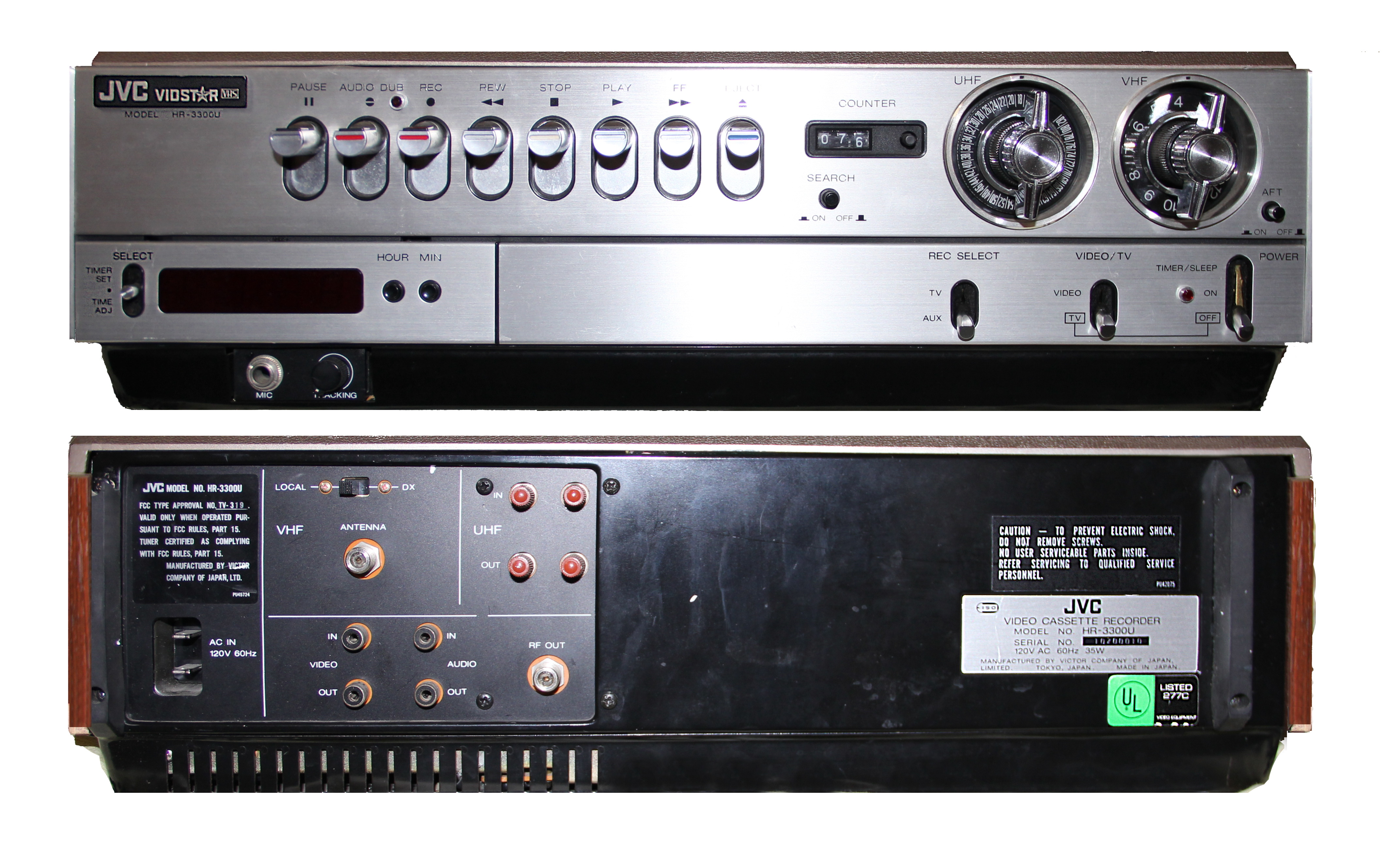
The first VHS recorder

- The first VHS (Video Home System) recorder and player, the HR-3300 manufactured by JVC, went on sale to the public at electronic stores in Tokyo's Akihabara district. The initial cost of the recorder, invented by JVC engineers Yuma Shiraishi and Shizuo Takano, was ¥310,000 Japanese yen (US$1,060, equivalent to $5,100 in 2021). It would go on sale in the United States 10 months later on August 23, 1977, under the name "Vidstar".
- Died:
  - Clarence Chamberlin, 82, American aviator, died of complications after receiving the "swine flu" vaccination. On June 4, 1927, Chamberlin became the second pilot (after Charles Lindbergh 15 days earlier) to fly an airplane by himself nonstop across the Atlantic Ocean, and the first to take a passenger with him.
  - Eileen Gray, 98, Irish modern architect
