= Atom the Amazing Zombie Killer =

- Directed by: Zack Beins; Richard Taylor
- Written by: Zack Beins; Richard Taylor; Tim Johnson
- Produced by: Zack Beins; Richard Taylor; Tim Johnson; Robert Sausaman
- Starring: Mark Shonsey; Lindy Starr; Zachary Byron Helm; Lloyd Kaufman
- Production company: Bizjack Flemco
- Release date: April 20, 2012 (Denver Starland Horror Fest)
- Running time: 80 minutes
- Country: United States
- Language: English

Atom the Amazing Zombie Killer is a 2012 American independent horror comedy feature film directed by Zack Beins and Richard Taylor, and written by Tim Johnson. It stars Mark Shonsey, Lindy Starr, Zachary Byron Helm, and Lloyd Kaufman.

== Plot synopsis ==
Atom (Mark Shonsey) is an avid bowler and hardcore horror movie fan. After having his team barred from the championship due to bowling alley corruption and losing his horny girlfriend Emily (Lindy Starr) to sadistic rival bowler Dario (Zachary Byron Helm), Atom suffers a severe head injury, causing him to hallucinate that everyone around him are the flesh-eating undead. Believing the zombie apocalypse has arrived, Atom must defend himself from the "zombies" in the most violent and unpredictable manner possible.

Atom the Amazing Zombie Killer has been described as a "love letter to Troma", featuring much of the campy aesthetic and graphic violence and nudity common of the company's films, as well as including many overt references to Troma movies and a cameo appearance from Troma president Lloyd Kaufman.

== Cast ==
- Mark Shonsey as Atom
- Babette Bombshell as Areola, The Twilight Temptress
- Ketrick 'Jazz' Copeland as Chief of Police (credited as Ketrick Copeland)
- Clay Greene as Mike
- Zachary Byron Helm as Dario
- Tim Johnson as Lional
- Lloyd Kaufman as Grampa Abracrombie
- Colden King as Jason
- David Mikalson as Herbie
- Maggie Moore as Tiffany
- Matt Need as Ernie Vice
- Alec Rippe as Fred
- Crystal Rose as Brittany
- Lindy Starr as Emily
- Gregg Stone as Jebediah
- Richard Taylor as Detective Dick
- Rionna Vigil as Alison

== Production ==
Atom is the first feature-length film from Denver, Colorado-based production company Bizjack Flemco and filmmakers Zack Beins and Richard Taylor, who had previously directed the 2007 short film The Misled Romance of Cannibal Girl & Incest Boy and had provided special effects work for several independent films, most notably Troma Entertainment's Poultrygeist: Night of the Chicken Dead. To help finance the film, Beins and Taylor shot a fake trailer to generate interest, and hosted several benefit concerts for the movie with local bands.

The film was shot entirely in the cities of Denver and Arvada, Colorado over the course of four years. According to interviews with Taylor and Beins, the production was troubled by numerous issues, exacerbated by the extremely low budget of the film; notably, large portions of the film had to be re-shot after one of the main actors quit and had to be recast, while problems in finding affordable filming locations resulted in shooting at five different bowling alleys. Atom was shot in high-definition video; as neither Beins or Taylor owned an HD camera, the two tracked down a friend who did and offered him an acting role in exchange for use of their camera. The "film within the film" was written and directed by producer Robert Sausaman, who also created most of the practical effects in the movie.

In addition to Troma president Lloyd Kaufman, the cast of Atom also includes cameo appearances from Denver performance artist Maris the Great, KBPI DJs Uncle Nasty and Matt Need, paranormal claims investigators Bryan & Baxter, internet personality Shawn C. Phillips and popular drag queen horror actor Babette Bombshell (Not Another B Movie, Return to the Class of Nuke 'Em High). Zachary Byron Helm, who was cast as the film's primary antagonist Dario, is the president of the Denver Hearse Association, and several of his hearses were used in the production. Writer Tim Johnson wrote the screenplay for the hip-hop monster movie Snake Outta Compton, released in 2018.

== Release and media ==
Atom the Amazing Zombie Killer made its premiere at the Denver Starfest convention on April 20, 2012, and continued to play at independent film festivals across the Midwest, including the TromaDance Film Festival in Albuquerque, New Mexico, the Denver Indie Fest and the Fort Collins Horror Film Festival, as well as select screenings in Salt Lake City and Las Vegas. In 2013, the film was screened at the Denver Comic Con, followed by a Los Angeles premiere at the California Institute of Abnormalarts. The same year, Atom was again screened in Denver with Midget Zombie Takeover by The Worst Movie Ever! director Glenn Berggoetz.

A DVD release of the film is scheduled after the film completes its film festival run. According to Taylor and Beins, Troma may release it should the filmmakers not find a better distribution deal. In November 2012, Bizjack Flemco independently released a limited run of fifty VHS copies of the film in a clamshell box.

In 2013 at San Diego Comic-Con Taylor and Beins sat on the panel for Troma Entertainment and were asked by a fan if the film will be released on something more current than VHS. Taylor asks Lloyd Kaufman if Troma would release a DVD of the film. Kaufman replies "Will see how it does on VHS."

The film's eponymous theme song was written and recorded by the Orange County comedy punk band The Radioactive Chicken Heads. The song also appears on the band's 2009 rarities album Poultry Uprising and in a 16-bit remix on their 2013 video game Badd Bunny Breakout. In 2013, Taylor and Beins directed a music video for the song in La Habra, California, featuring the Chicken Heads and numerous cameos from local musicians, including Dukey Flyswatter of Haunted Garage. The video premiered on September 3, 2013.

A digital soundtrack album for the film, featuring both the original score done by Tim Johnson and songs from punk, rock and metal bands, was released on the online music store Bandcamp on May 10, 2012. In 2012, another music video was produced and made for the song "Rock & Bowl" which features all the producers of Atom under the persona band Bolonium.

On May 28, 2014, it was announced that the film will be released on DVD officially by Whacked Movies early 2015. The Special Edition DVD was released on August 25, 2015.
