= Kudashov =

Kudashov (Russian: Кудашов) is a Russian masculine surname, its feminine counterpart is Kudashova. The surname is a derivative of the Turkic name Kudash, which possibly originates from the Mordvinic word kudo, meaning home. It may refer to:

- Alexei Kudashov (born 1971), Russian ice hockey coach and former player
- Tatiana Kudashova (born 1997), Russian taekwondo athlete
- Vladimir Kudashov (1918–1976), Russian soldier
