= Bolonium =

American indie rock band

- Origin: Denver, Colorado
- Genres: Indie rock, post-punk, new wave, comedy rock
- Years active: 2012–present
- Labels: Needlejuice; Bizjack Flemco

Bolonium is an American indie rock band based out of Denver, Colorado, formed in 2012 by filmmakers and musicians Richard “Bizjack” Taylor and Tim Johnson.

Bolonium's music has evolved with each successive studio album, originating in a more overtly comedy and novelty-oriented style before settling into a broader mix of indie rock, post-punk and new wave. The band has attracted critical praise from regional publications, including winning several awards from Denver's Westword, has been featured on the nationally-syndicated Dr. Demento Show, and have played numerous live shows with a diverse range of bands including The Gregory Brothers, Peelander-Z and Clownvis Presley. As of 2026, Bolonium have released five studio albums.

== Biography ==
=== Formation (2012) ===
Bolonium's core creative duo consist of singer and songwriter Richard Taylor and multi-instrumentalist Tim Johnson, two Denver-based filmmakers and musicians who met in film school and subsequently collaborated on a number of independent video projects, most notably the 2012 low-budget horror comedy feature film Atom the Amazing Zombie Killer, on which both worked in multiple production roles. The pair wrote and recorded the original song "Rock and Bowl" for the movie's soundtrack as well as filmed an accompanying music video, both attributed to the fictitious band "Bolonium", named after a fictional meat-based fuel from the 1982 science fiction cult film Big Meat Eater. The experience of writing and recording music together, however, ultimately inspired Taylor and Johnson to develop Bolonium into a real band.

=== Bolonium and live shows (2015–2018) ===
Bolonium independently released their self-titled debut album on May 5, 2015, preceded and succeeded by the daily release of twelve music videos, one for each of the album's songs. In an interview with KGNU, Taylor and Johnson explained the importance of emphasizing the visual aspect of the band as much as their music, drawing upon their backgrounds in both video and animation.

Bolonium was released to positive reviews from the Colorado alternative press. Yellow Scene magazine praised the band's "strange blend of uniquely stylized musical comedy" as "a very pleasant experience", additionally describing their music videos as "a special kind of weird (in a good way)". The following year, Bolonium gained wider recognition from the international comedy music scene when their song "Banana Peels Are Slippery" was added to The FuMP—The Funny Music Project, an online collaboration of comedy musicians - appearing on the website's CD compilation album The FuMP Volume 56 as well as receiving airplay on the long-running novelty music showcase The Dr. Demento Show.

Although Taylor and Johnson had initially never intended for Bolonium to perform live, the duo chose to establish Bolonium as a live band in 2016, recruiting a rhythm section of drummer Bonnie Finley and bassist Ben Drendel, the latter of whom was succeeded by Paul Day in 2017. The quartet performed their first live show at The 7th Circle in Denver on May 13, 2016, and have continued to play frequently throughout the Denver area, opening for such comedic and theatrical acts as Peelander-Z and Clownvis Presley and performing at events including the Denver StarFest science fiction convention and the 2018 "Weird Al" Yankovic fan convention Fest of Al, where they opened for The Gregory Brothers.

On October 13, 2018, Bolonium performed live on the PBS12 series Sounds on 29th, a showcase of Denver music and comedy act, where several of their music videos had previously been featured.

=== Snacktacular (2019–2020) ===
Snacktacular, Bolonium's second studio album and first recorded with a full band, was released on September 24, 2019, by Needlejuice Records, an independent label which houses artists including Lemon Demon and MC Lars. The album was again received well by the comedy music community, with the track "Cosplay Suit" added to The FuMP and its CD compilation The FuMP Volume 78. Like their debut, Snacktacular was accompanied by a consecutive series of music videos, ten for the album's eleven songs. In a 2020 "Best of Denver" feature by Westword newspaper, Bolonium were voted as having the "Best Music Video Series" for Snacktacular, the paper writing "there is something special about a rock-and-roll band that refuses to be chained to earnestness, that breaks from every conventional subject matter, and that creates something heartily geeky to boot".

=== Full of it and Leftovers (2021–2023) ===
On March 2, 2021, Bolonium independently released their third studio album Full of it. Written and recorded during the COVID-19 pandemic, Full of it featured a darker experimental sound which the band described as "more mysterious and psychedelic". On the topic of writing the album during the pandemic lockdown, Johnson explained "We just kind of wanted to see where the muse took us...[I]t kind of ended up having a theme of nostalgia and thinking about how things used to be, and just being in this strange, dystopian world that we don't really know how to navigate".

Full of it received positive reviews from local publications. The Westword praised the "more mature" sound of its songs, noting the band "may have arrived at a fully congealed sound from which to proceed in the future" and humorously stating "anyone who doesn't appreciate a man with an accordion has no soul". Independent arts and culture magazine Birdy called it "an amusing and rewarding listen beginning to end", complimenting the band's "knack for crafting memorable melodies" which they likened to "an orchestral mélange of an Adult Swim musical skit, They Might Be Giants, 8-bit video game music and Devo".

Though a partial music video for the song "Jiggowatts" was posted on the day of Full of it's release, Bolonium refrained from posting music videos until October 1, 2021, when they released FULL OF IT the Movie, a 10-minute short film composed of songs from the album.

Bolonium's fourth album, Leftovers, was released on February 22, 2022. The title refers to the tracks being unfinished, "leftover" songs from previous recording sessions that were destroyed when Johnson's Subaru Forester caught fire and burned his laptop. Bolonium salvaged the demo files and enlisted the help of over 20 artists to complete the songs. Included on the album are the NYC band Theophobia, LA musicians Anthony Kapfer and Radioactive Chicken Heads, and many Colorado musicians including Felix Ayodele, Niki Geron, Pretty Loud, Extra Kool, Television Generation, The Red Tack, and members of Johnson's former band The Pinkoes. Denver publication Westword voted the album "Best Pandemic Baby Album of 2022".

Bolonium released several videos to accompany "Leftovers," including the title track which featured Troma president Lloyd Kaufman. Their cover of the song "Worthless," from the Brave Little Toaster soundtrack, was directed and animated by Bolonium drummer Bonnie Finley.

=== Foney (2025) ===
On May 7, 2025, Bolonium independently released their fifth studio album Foney on Bizjack Flemco Records. In promotion of the album, the band released two music videos, "Outta Touch" and "No Boloney in the Bed".

== Band members ==
Current members

- Richard Taylor – Vocals, Accordion, Synthesizer (2012–present)
- Tim Johnson – Lead guitar (2012–present)
- Bonnie Finley – Drums (2016–present)
- Logan Rainard – Bass (2021–present)

Former members

- Ben Drendel – keyboards, bass (2016–2017)
- Paul Day – bass (2017–2021)
- Zack Beins – backup vocals live (2016–2019)

== Discography ==
Studio albums

Year	Title	Label
May 5, 2015	Bolonium	Bizjack Flemco Records
September 24, 2019	Snacktacular	Needlejuice Records
March 2, 2021	Full Of it	Bizjack Flemco Records
February 22, 2022	Leftovers	Bizjack Flemco Records
May 7, 2025	Foney	Bizjack Flemco Records

Compilation appearances

Year	Song	Source
2016	"Banana Peels Are Slippery"	The FuMP Volume 56: March - April 2016 (FIDIM Interactive, LLC)
2019	"Cosplay Suit"	The FuMP Volume 78: November - December 2019 (FIDIM Interactive, LLC)
2023	"X-Mess"	The FuMP Volume 102: November-December 2023 (FIDIM Interactive, LLC)
