= Bryan & Baxter =

Paranormal claims investigation team

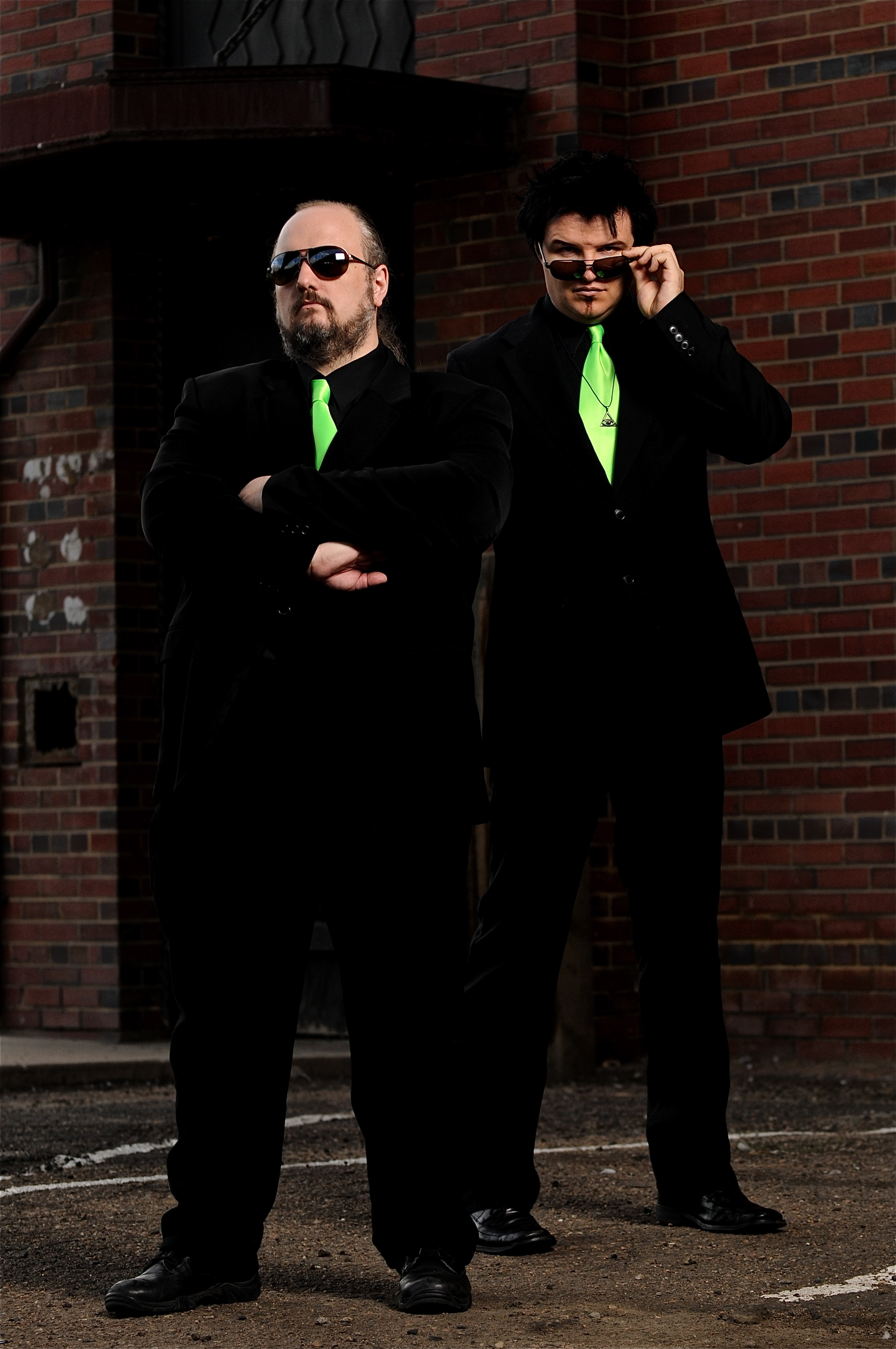
Bryan & Baxter (2010)

Bryan & Baxter was a paranormal claims investigation team composed of Bryan Bonner and Matthew Baxter. Their investigations included claims of ghosts, poltergeists, psychics, UFOs, conspiracy theories, and urban legends. They specialized in exposing frauds, and became associated with scientific skepticism. They were based in Denver, Colorado.

== Background ==
Bonner founded the Rocky Mountain Paranormal Society in 1999, influenced not by personal experiences of the paranormal, but by an interest in the paranormal developed by horror movies (such as The Exorcist), and the paranormal claims made in ghost hunting reality television shows.

Bryan & Baxter made the distinction that they did not investigate the paranormal, but rather the legitimacy of the paranormal claims made by others. Their credentials included certifications from the manufacturers of the equipment they used and certification in electromagnetic field studies for broadcast equipment.

They brought a background in video and photography. They also worked with a network of people in other specialties, including geologists, medical doctors, video and audio production people, linguists, and magicians, the latter of special value due to their expertise in misdirection and perception.

== Public outreach ==
Bryan & Baxter gave presentations and classes to the public dealing with pseudoscience and the paranormal. These events included presentations at the University of Colorado, Metropolitan State University, Ohlone College, The Denver Art Museum, SkeptiCamp, The Amazing Meeting, and StarFest/HorrorFest.

At The Amazing Meeting in 2012, they assisted the James Randi Educational Foundation with its One Million Dollar Paranormal Challenge, a test that offered a one million dollar prize to anyone who could demonstrate a paranormal ability under controlled conditions.

== Controversies ==
=== Denver Extraterrestrial Affairs Commission ===
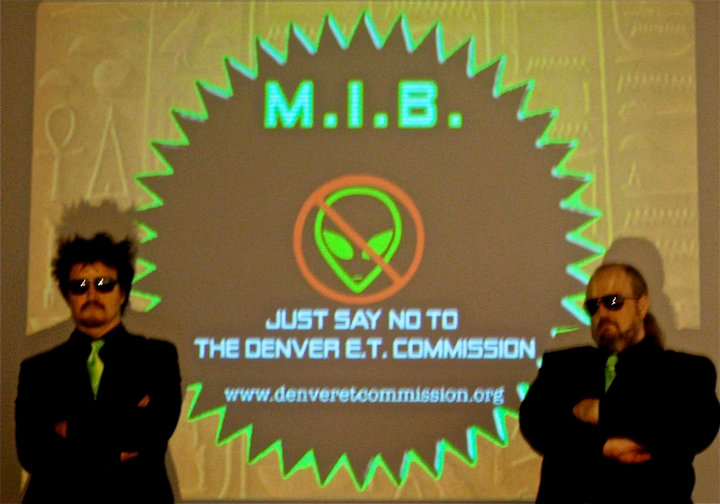
Bryan & Baxter at the Denver Art Museum

In 2010, Denver, Colorado resident Jeff Peckman initiated a citizen ballot proposal to create an Extraterrestrials Affairs Commission, to prepare for visits from extraterrestrials, and which garnered international interest. Bryan & Baxter headed the opposition group The Mission for Inhibiting Bureaucracy (The M.I.B.). After the proposal was defeated, Peckman filed a complaint with the Denver Board of Ethics, where he says of Bryan & Baxter: "They are known as very disreputable, incompetent, unethical, and hostile persons within the field of paranormal research". The complaint goes on to suggest Bryan & Baxter's opposition to the ballot initiative was due to their involvement with the CIA, NSA, or other covert agencies.

In 2011, the Denver Board of Ethics dismissed this complaint for lack of jurisdiction, and because the complaint did not deal with any issues that are covered by the Denver Code of Ethics.

=== Stanley Hotel ===
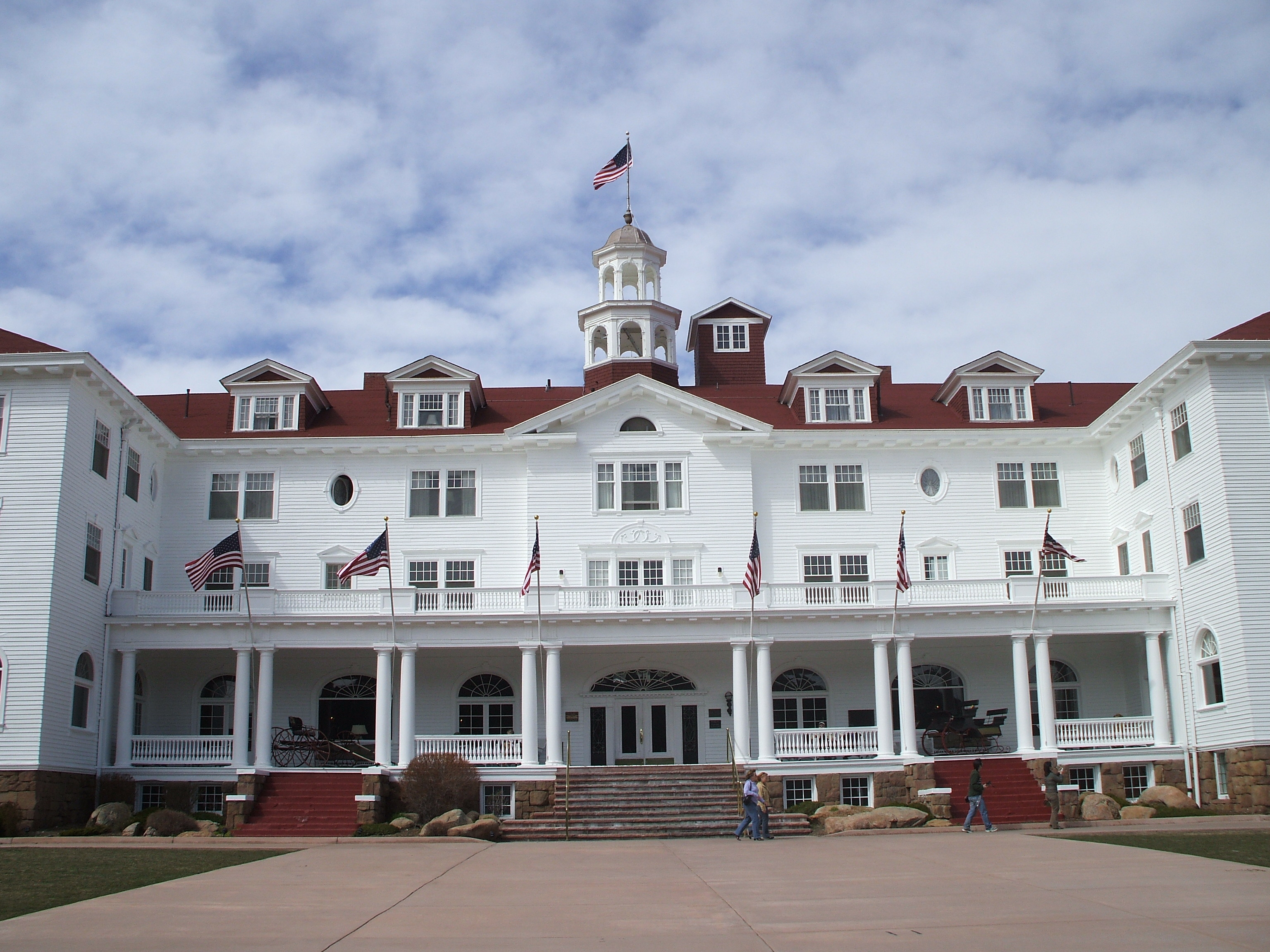
Stanley Hotel in Estes Park, Colorado

The television show Ghost Hunters had investigated the Stanley Hotel (the setting that inspired Stephen King's book The Shining), and claimed it had paranormal activity because of certain minerals present on the property. The hotel sells tickets to tour its paranormal activity and haunted areas. In 2008, Bryan & Baxter worked with the USDA to perform a soil survey of the premises, with the result showing that the claimed minerals were not in fact present. Bonner states that the hotel owners then asked they not spread the results of this report.

=== Colorado Springs Evergreen Cemetery ===
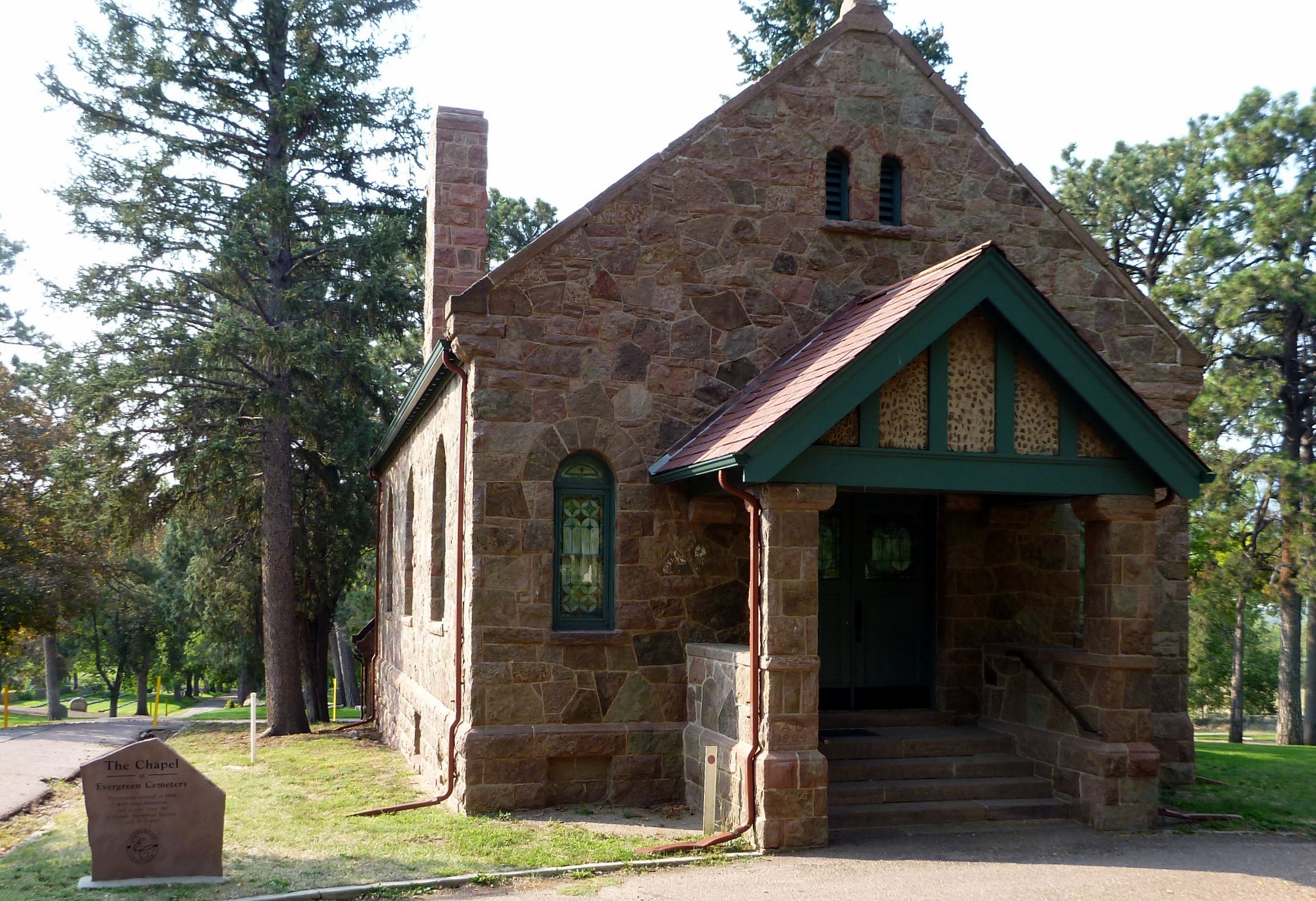
Evergreen Cemetery in Colorado Springs

In June 2011, Bryan & Baxter, along with others, paid for a late night "Haunted Tour" in Colorado Springs, Colorado offered by the ghost hunting group Pure Paranormal. After the tour, Bryan & Baxter contacted the cemetery manager to complain of what they felt was unethical and disrespectful behavior during the tour on the part of Pure Paranormal. The city subsequently ended the Pure Paranormal tours, and instituted new policies to restrict such cemetery activity.

Bryan & Baxter presented this at the 2011 Colorado SkeptiCamp conference, and this presentation was recorded and posted on the web. Pure Paranormal filed a copyright complaint about the video, and the video hosting service withdrew the video. This action was disputed and the video was later restored.

=== KDVR UFOs over Denver ===
In November 2012, Investigative Reporter Heidi Hemmat of Fox News affiliate KDVR News did a story about a video sent in by a source wishing to remain anonymous, of several blurry unidentified flying objects filmed near Denver, Colorado. The story received world-wide attention. Hemmat insisted the objects were not birds, bugs, or planes, and that no one was able to determine what they were. Bryan and Baxter contacted Hemmat, questioning that conclusion, and offering their own video and analysis demonstrating the objects could in fact be birds or bugs. On a follow-up segment aired Nov 20, Hemmat continued to claim the objects remained unexplained.

=== Selected media coverage ===
==== Filmography ====
Year	Title	Role	Notes
2008	Ghosts of the Elitch Theatre	Themselves	by Little Fist Productions
2008	The Stanley Effect	Themselves	by 13 Pictures
2009	Ghosts of Capitol Hill	Themselves	by Michael Gross Productions
2012	Atom the Amazing Zombie Killer	Used car salesmen	by Bizjack Flemco
2012	P.M.	Themselves	by Dave Franco
2013	The Castle Project	Themselves	by Brian Higgins

==== Television ====
Year	Title	Notes
2000	Scariest Places On Earth	Episode 1.1
2005	Is It Real?	Episode 1.3 Ghosts
2006	Ghost Hunters	Season 2, Bonus Investigation: Elkhorn Lodge
2008	Larry King Live	Space Alien Caught On Tape?
2010	Most Terrifying Places in America	Part 6
2012	National Geographic Channel	The Secret History of UFOs

==== Books ====
Year	Title	Author	Publisher
2002	Ghosts, Critters, and Sacred Places of Washington and Oregon III	Jefferson Davis	Norseman Ventures
2006	A Case For Ghosts	J.A. Danalek	Llewellyn Publications
2008	Ghost in the Mirror	Leslie Rule	Andrews McMeel Publishing
2008	Ghosts of Colorado	Dennis Baker	Schiffer Publishing
2010	Weird Colorado	Charmaine Ortega Getz	Sterling Publishing
2011	The Haunted History of the Croke Patterson Mansion	Ann Leggett	The History Press
