= Concordia Lutheran High School (Indiana) =

Location
- 1601 St. Joe River Drive; Fort Wayne, Indiana 46805; United States; 41°6′35.4″N 85°7′4.08″W

Information
- Type: Private high school
- Religious affiliation: Lutheran Church–Missouri Synod
- Established: 1935; 91 years ago
- Head of School: Jacob Pennekamp
- Teaching staff: 54.9 (on an FTE basis)
- Grades: 9–12
- Enrollment: 727 (2025-2026)
- Student to teacher ratio: 12.9
- Campus size: 40 acres (16 ha)
- Colors: Maroon and white
- Slogan: “We Love It Here!”
- Song: Concordia High Thy Praises
- Athletics conference: Summit Athletic Conference
- Nickname: Cadets
- Rival: Bishop Dwenger
- Accreditation: National Lutheran School Accreditation Indiana Department of Education Cognia
- Publication: Cadets Magazine
- Newspaper: Lu-Hi Voice
- Yearbook: Luminarian
- Website: www.clhscadets.com

Concordia Lutheran High School is a secondary school affiliated with the Lutheran Church–Missouri Synod (LCMS), serving grades 9 - 12 in Fort Wayne, Indiana, United States.

== History ==
In 1916, the LCMS congregations in Fort Wayne started the Luther Institute, a two-year secondary school teaching basic office skills such as typing and shorthand, and also business law and Bible classes. Initially the school used facilities in those congregations. In 1920, the leaders of the Luther Institute suggested a merger with the high school department of Concordia College, but no agreement was reached, so in 1924-25 the institute erected a three-story building (demolished in 2006) at the corner of Barr and Washington.

Negotiations for the merger were successfully reopened in 1934. The resulting Lutheran High School opened in 1935, using two floors of Hanser Hall on the college campus after seven Lutheran churches in Fort Wayne raised $6,000 to renovate and equip the facility. From 1935 to 1947, the college controlled the academic aspects of the high school, while the Lutheran High School Association handled the financial aspects. The high school undertook steps to receive accreditation from the state of Indiana in 1938.

By 1947, increased enrollment had strained the 300-student capacity of the building, so the association constructed a new classroom building on 1.3 acres (0.53 ha) in the southeast corner of the college campus. The new building at Anthony Boulevard and Maumee Avenue opened in 1952. The high school continued to use the athletic and other facilities of the college. In 1955, the name of the school was officially changed to Concordia Lutheran High School.

In 1957, the LCMS decided to close Concordia College. The acreage allocated to the high school was increased to 4.86 acres (1.97 ha), and six additional classrooms were constructed that same year. The next year the remainder of the college campus was sold to Indiana Technical College.

That same year, 1958, a group of Lutheran businessmen took an option on 23 acres (9.3 ha) containing Zollner Stadium at North Anthony Boulevard and St. Joe River Drive. The next year the high school association purchased that property and an additional 8 acres (3.2 ha) on the west side of Anthony for construction of the current building. After $950,000 was raised in a pledge drive, ground was broken for the new facility, designed by architect James Sherbondy, in March 1963. Classes moved to the new campus in the fall of 1963. The old campus was sold to Indiana Technical College, which uses the former high school building as its Cunningham Business Center.

In 1973, a music wing, a chapel-auditorium, and additional classrooms were constructed. More land has also been added to the campus, including 7.55 acres (3.06 ha) along Crescent Avenue donated by Fred Zollner and the 4.5-acre (1.8 ha) “Our Creators Classroom” nature area north of the school, raising the size of the campus to 40 acres (16 ha). Zollner Stadium has also been rebuilt.

== Academics ==
Concordia emphasizes a Christ-centered education, integrating faith into academics and daily life. Students participate in weekly chapel services, small-group devotions, and service projects.

== Student Life ==
Students at Concordia are involved in over 40 clubs and activities, including peer ministry, theater, choir, robotics, National Honor Society, and service organizations.

== Athletics ==
The Concordia Lutheran Cadets compete in the Summit Athletic Conference. The school colors are maroon and white. Concordia offers the following Indiana High School Athletic Association (IHSAA) sanctioned sports:

- Baseball (boys)
- Basketball (girls and boys)
  - Girls state champion - 2010, 2012
- Cross country (girls and boys)
  - Girls state champion - 1983
  - Boys state champion - 2019
- Football (boys)
  - State champion - 2016
- Golf (girls and boys)
- Gymnastics (girls)
- Soccer (girls and boys)
- Softball (girls)
- Swim and dive (girls and boys)
- Tennis (girls and boys)
- Track and field (girls and boys)
  - Boys state champion - 1999
- Volleyball (girls and boys)
  - State champion (girls) - 2014
- Wrestling (boys)
- Flag Football (girls)

Club sports include bowling (girls and boys), crew (girls and boys), and lacrosse (boys).

== Fine Arts ==
The Concordia Lutheran High School Marching Cadets received first place at the Indiana State School Music Association (ISSMA) Class C State Finals in 2013.

Concordia Lutheran High School is home to five total choirs: Women's Chorus (beginning choir for women), Men's Chorus (beginning choir for men), Bella Voce (intermediate choir for women), A Cappella (advanced choir for sophomore through senior men and women), and the Maroon Standard also known as the Chamber Choir (students auditioned out of the bigger A Capella Choir).

Concordia also has several instrumental programs, including the entry level concert band and symphonic band. Jazz band and orchestra are also available.

The Drama Department performs five productions annually, including a musical and a children's theater production. Concordia is a member of the International Thespian Society, Troupe #4055. The group has competed and attended the Regional Thespian Conference.

== Junior ROTC ==
Concordia's Junior ROTC program has been offered since the start of Concordia and is why the school's teams are called "The Cadets". More than 100 students are enrolled in the program. A number of JROTC students have attended service academies such as West Point, Annapolis, Air Force Academy and the Coast Guard Academy.

=== Teams ===
CLHS has had a number of teams make it to the finals of the JROTC Leadership & Academic Bowl in Washington D.C.

The VEX Robotics teams are two-time VEX JROTC Robotics Champions.

== Notable alumni ==
- Glenn Berggoetz - director, writer, and actor
- Dave Herman - professional MMA fighter
- Eugene E. Parker - NFL agent
- Zach Panning - Professional marathon runner
- Brian Reith - Major League Baseball (MLB) player

== See also ==
- List of high schools in Indiana
