= The Misled Romance of Cannibal Girl & Incest Boy =

- Directed by: Richard Taylor
- Written by: Richard Taylor; Zack Beins
- Starring: Janine Laurent; Paul Lucero; Lloyd Kaufman
- Cinematography: Drew Adams
- Edited by: Tim Johnson
- Music by: Tim Johnson
- Distributed by: Bizjack/Flemco Productions; Troma Entertainment
- Release date: February 14, 2007
- Running time: 13 minutes
- Country: United States
- Language: English

The Misled Romance of Cannibal Girl & Incest Boy is a 2007 independent short horror film directed by Richard Taylor and produced by the Denver, Colorado-based production company, Bizjack Flemco (Atom the Amazing Zombie Killer).

== Overview ==
The story of Cannibal Girl revolves around the courtship between a cannibalistic goth girl and a mildly deformed inbred boy as they joyously engage in a series of homicidal shenanigans. Filmed entirely in Super 8mm, Cannibal Girl contains no actual dialogue, its soundtrack consisting of a psychedelic/industrial score. The film also features a cameo appearance by Troma Entertainment co-founder Lloyd Kaufman as one of Cannibal Girl's victims.

== Reception ==
Cannibal Girl screened at a number of international film festivals, including Syracuse, New York's B-Movie Film Festival, TromaDance in Park City, Utah, Horrorfest in Cape Town, South Africa, the Dark Carnival Film Festival in Bloomington, Indiana and Fear in New Orleans. Critical opinion was predominantly positive: horror movie website Bloody Disgusting awarded it a score of 8/10, calling it a "real treat" for gore fanatics and "so off-the-wall it has to be seen to be believed!", later listing it as amongst the best films of 2008, PopMatters described it as "fabulous [and] freaky", Kotori Magazine praised it as an "exquisite torrent of bloodlust and goregasms that rivals any standard Direct-to-DVD slasher film" and the Eye Crave Network summarized it as a "monumentally creative and thoroughly disturbed gem of indie splatstick".

== Home media ==
Cannibal Girl was initially sold on "Head Splittin' Special Edition" self-made DVDs by the filmmakers themselves exclusively on the film's official MySpace – where in sold in excess of 1,000 copies – before being given national distribution by Troma Entertainment as a selection on volume five of "The Best of TromaDance".
