= To Die Is Hard =

To Die is Hard
- Directed by: Glenn Berggoetz
- Written by: Glenn Berggoetz
- Produced by: Glenn Berggoetz
- Starring: Glenn Berggoetz
- Cinematography: Alan Dague-Greene
- Edited by: Alan Dague-Greene
- Music by: Glenn Berggoetz; Alan Dague-Greene
- Distributed by: Driving With Our Eyes Shut
- Release date: December 2010
- Running time: 87 minutes
- Country: United States
- Language: English
- Box office: $4,549

To Die is Hard is a small-budget B movie (made for a reported $2,000) written, directed by, and starring Glenn Berggoetz. Released in just a handful of theaters in December 2010 and early 2011, the film was largely loved by critics, and in 2014 Paste magazine selected it as the 16th greatest B movie of all time in its list of the 100 greatest B movies ever made.

== Plot synopsis ==
To Die is Hard is a spoof comedy that follows the exploits of Dr. Joe McCann (played by Berggoetz), an English professor. Universally lusted over by women and men alike (and uncomfortably idolized by his twelve-year-old daughter), McCann springs into action when four terrorists invade the college campus he teaches at. Utilizing cunning and some awkward martial arts moves, McCann takes on the terrorists one by one. The film climaxes when McCann finds himself face-to-face with the terrorist mastermind Anton (played by actor Baird Lefter), and the two men engage in comical hand-to-hand combat. The film is a spoof of the Die Hard series of films.

== Reception ==
=== Critical ===
To Die is Hard has not only been well received by critics, with critic Terra King stating the film is “completely gut splitting,” The Reel Nerds comparing the film to The Naked Gun series of films, and critic Jef Otte saying, “The film takes a Will Ferrell-esque approach to badassitude," it has also resonated with viewers. In the IMDb list of the highest-rated spoof comedies of all time as voted on by viewers, To Die is Hard typically finds itself ranked in the top one hundred. In addition, in 2022, BuzzFeed ranked the film as the 20th-best B movie ever.

=== Commercial ===
While To Die is Hard has generated box office dollars that are small by Hollywood standards, the film still picks up occasional late-night/midnight screenings.
