= Vladimir Kudashov =

Soviet soldier

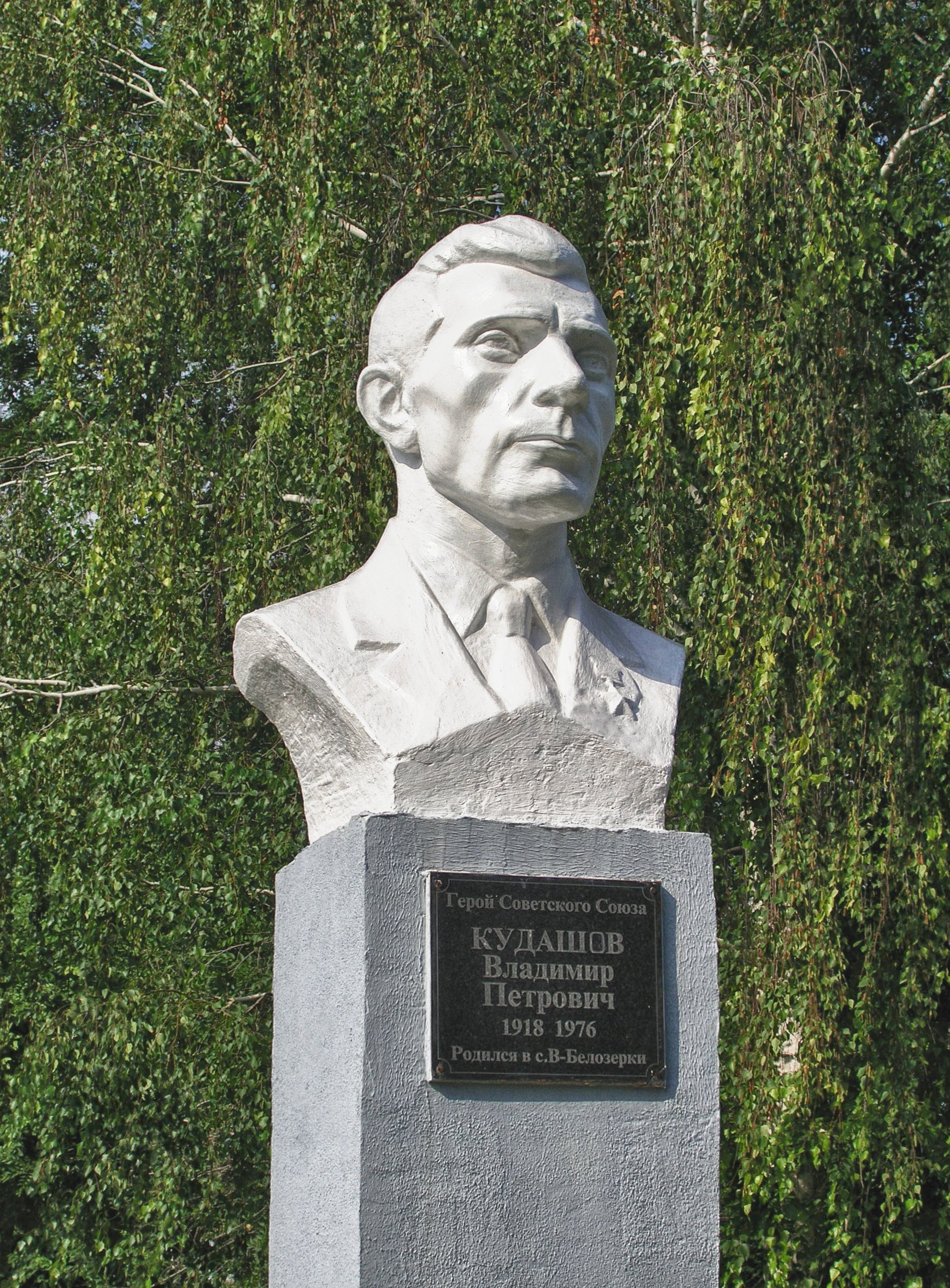
Bust of Vladimir Kudashov

Vladimir Petrovich Kudashov (Russian: Влади́мир Петро́вич Кудашо́в)(1918 – 1976) was a Soviet soldier of World War II (called, in the Soviet Union, the Great Patriotic War) and a Hero of the Soviet Union.

== Biography ==
Kudashov was born in the village of Upper Belozёrki in Stavropol Region of Samara province.

Kudashov joined in the Red Army in 1940. From the very beginning of the German invasion of the Soviet Union in 1941 he was involved in battle, and he was slightly wounded.

He was assigned to the 7th Independent Motorized Pontoon Bridge Battalion. In May 1942, when this battalion was part of Southwestern Front, during the Kharkov Offensive, Kudashov participated in various actions, including covering river crossings under enemy mortar and machine-gun fire, for which he was awarded a "For Service in Battle" medal.

In 1943, his unit was part of the Steppe Front. On 27 September 1943 Kudashov, then a corporal, was involved in the assembly of a 30-ton ferry for the crossing of tanks onto the right bank of the Dnieper. Kudashov showed leadership and coolness under enemy artillery and mortar fire, helping to ensure that the tanks were safely delivered across the river, for which he was awarded a second "For Service in Battle" medal and was promoted to sergeant and squad leader.

In 1944 the 7th Independent Motorized Pontoon Bridge Battalion was part of the 1st Pontoon Bridge Brigade of the 46th Army, part of the 2nd Ukrainian Front (the successor to the Steppe Front).

Kudashov particularly distinguished himself in December 1944. Before 46th Army's crossing of the Danube Kudashov, together with Corporal Suslov and Private Yakushev, made a reconnaissance sortie behind enemy lines. They attacked a German headquarters, destroying a staff car and seizing documents from the corpses of the German occupants.

During the Danube crossing, one of the assault pontoons was damaged. Kudashov, under enemy fire, was able to seal the holes and save the landing, and returned enemy fire. That night Kudashov made five crossings of the Danube, bringing soldiers, weapons, and ammunition.

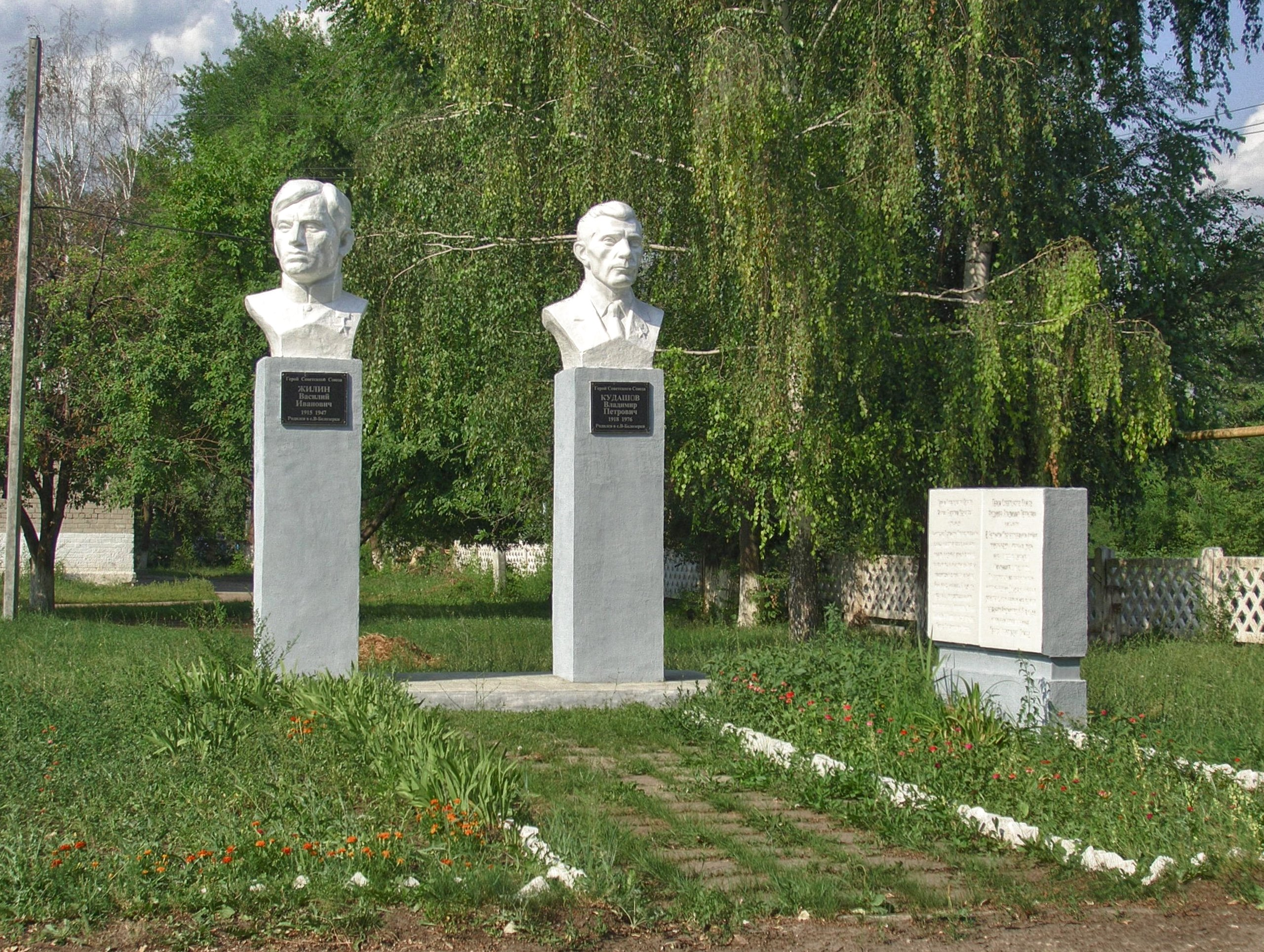
Kudashov and Zhilin at Upper Belozёrki

After the war Kudashov returned to his native village, where he was a farm foreman. For distinguished service to labor he received a second Order of Lenin. He died in Upper Belozёrki on 20 October 1976.

He is memorialized in Upper Belozёrki with a bust next to that of his fellow villager and Hero of the Soviet Union Vasily Zhilin but – unusually, given the number of monuments in Tolyatti, and in contrast to Zhilin – he is not memorialized in the city of Tolyatti.

== Awards ==
- Hero of the Soviet Union (Number 6386, awarded 24 March 1945)
- two Order of Lenin medals (one was awarded 24 March 1945)
- Two "For Service in Battle" medals (awarded 2 November 1942 and 7 November 1943)
- Medal For Courage (awarded 22 September 1944)
