= Glenn Berggoetz =

American director, writer and actor

- Born: October 29, 1966 (age 60)
- Occupations: Film director, author, screenwriter, film actor, film producer, composer, educator
- Years active: 2008–present

Glenn Berggoetz is an American director, writer, actor, and guitarist for the band Norwegian Soft Kitten. He is known for directing several low-budget films, including The Worst Movie Ever!, a film which had the lowest grossing opening weekend in history. His other films include To Die is Hard, Midget Zombie Takeover, Auto Shop of Horrors, Evil Intent, and The Ghosts of Johnson Woods.

== Background ==
Berggoetz was born on October 29, 1966, just outside Atlantic City, New Jersey, raised in Fort Wayne, Indiana, graduated from Concordia Lutheran High School, and received his master's degree at California State University, Dominguez Hills. In the mid-1990s, he began to write screenplays and, by 2006, had completed eight scripts. Unable to get his screenplays read by studios, and acting upon a suggestion, he decided to produce and direct his own films. His first effort was completed in 2006 when he finished filming the short Bad Movies, Good Showers and Civil Engineers. By the end of 2007, he had completed two additional shorts and two feature-length films. To date, three of his features have screened on Canadian television, six have received limited theatrical releases, and all nine of his feature films have distribution deals in place. Berggoetz's film The Worst Movie Ever! was selected by independent film critic Terra King as one of the ten best independent feature films of 2011. In 2013, Berggoetz premiered Midget Zombie Takeover in Winchester, Virginia. After that, Midget Zombie Takeover screened in many theaters across the United States and England.

In the spring of 2014, Paste released its list of the 100 greatest B movies in cinema history. Berggoetz's 2010 feature film To Die is Hard came in as the 16th-best B movie of all time on the list. In 2022, BuzzFeed picked "To Die is Hard" as the 20th-best B movie ever. Berggoetz's 2016 film The Ghosts of Johnson Woods that stars Joe Bob Briggs was selected by Gross Movie Reviews as one of the ten best films of that year.

In 2016, film critic Jim Vorel published a lengthy article about Berggoetz in which he said, "Glenn Berggoetz is a uniquely compelling individual - there's no one else like him," and, "The movie business would be unbearably drab without Berggoetz."

Berggoetz currently lives in Fort Wayne, Indiana, and is a professor who teaches writing classes at Purdue Fort Wayne. Berggoetz's third novel Fading to Black was released in 2021 by Solstice Publishing, with his historical novel Lorene's Salon being released in 2024.

== Filmography ==
- Guernica Still Burning (2008)
- Bad Movies, Good Showers, and Civil Engineers (2009)
- To Die Is Hard (2010)
- Therapissed (2010)
- Evil Intent (2010)
- The Worst Movie Ever! (2011)
- Separate Checks (2011)
- Midget Zombie Takeover (2013)
- Auto Shop of Horrors (2016)
- The Ghosts of Johnson Woods (2016)
- LoveSexHate (2017)
- Poetry Slammed (2018)
- Paralyzed with Fear (2019)
- The Death of Ivan Nussbaum (2025)
