= The Worst Movie Ever! =

2011 film by Glenn Berggoetz

- Original theatrical release poster
- Directed by: Glenn Berggoetz
- Written by: Glenn Berggoetz
- Produced by: Glenn Berggoetz
- Starring: Glenn Berggoetz
- Cinematography: Erik Lassi
- Edited by: Alan Dague-Greene
- Distributed by: Driving With Our Eyes Shut
- Release date: July 8, 2011 (Van Wert Independent Film Festival)
- Running time: 76 minutes
- Country: United States
- Language: English
- Box office: $25,206

The Worst Movie Ever! (stylized as THE WORST MOVIE EVER!!!!) is a 2011 American action comedy film. The film had its festival premiere at the Van Wert Independent Film Festival in Van Wert, Ohio on July 8, 2011. The film was written, produced, directed by, and starred Glenn Berggoetz. The film's director has stated that its low gross (opening day gross was $11, from one ticket sold) was not intended as a publicity stunt, and resulted from both the film being scheduled to screen as part of the theater's monthly "midnight screenings", and through problems in stirring interest in the theatrical release.

== Plot ==
A suburban neighborhood is invaded by stereotypes of common horror film characters.

== Cast ==
- Glenn Berggoetz as Johnny, Petey, Dr. Lars Coolman
- Eileen Barker as Laduelia
- Stuart Goldstein as Bobby
- Haidyn Harvey as Erica
- Bryce Foster as Brent
- Christopher Irvin as Dr. Dirk Ramrod
- Christine Mascolo as Angela
- Kasha Fauscett as Kristin
- Jeff Johnson as The Dark Overlord
- Jonathan Jorgensen as Santa Claus
- Carla Cannalte as Debbie
- Giovanna Leah as Running Woman
- Jeff McBride as Grocery Boy, Abe Lincoln
- Diane Henry as Petey's Girlfriend

== Release ==
The film had its festival premiere at the Van Wert Independent Film Festival in Van Wert, Ohio on July 8, 2011, where director Glenn Berggoetz spoke at a breakfast symposium and hosted a midnight screening of the film.

The film had its theatrical premiere on August 19, 2011 in a single cinema, the Laemmle Sunset 5 in Los Angeles, which resulted in the worst box office performance ever recorded: just one paid admission and grossed just $11. After its release, the film gained notoriety for its extremely low viewership. This figure makes it the lowest opening film in history, beating the 2006 film Zyzzyx Road, which attracted six patrons and $30 in revenue during its opening week. According to the websites Box Office Mojo and The Numbers, the film has now grossed over $25,000 in box office revenue.

According to director Glenn Berggoetz, the film sold just one ticket over the weekend (for the sole Saturday screening) and nobody attended the Friday screening. Attempts by the theater owner and filmmaker to locate the individual who paid to see the film over its opening weekend have so far failed.

== Critical response ==
Matt Singer wrote that the film lives up to its title and that it holds the possibility of becoming a cult hit, by writing that it is "quickly becoming the stuff of Internet legend as the worst grossing movie ever, a sales hook that plays nicely with that title. In the week of August 26, 2011, almost 70,000 people watched the film's trailer on YouTube. If even a fraction of those folks become curious enough to seek the film out, we could have a new cult hit on our hands." Since reporting of the film's lackluster premiere, the film's trailer has become a "mini-hit on YouTube" and initiated "something of a cult following on Facebook." The film's director has stated that the low gross was not intended as a publicity stunt, and resulted from both the film being scheduled to screen as part of the theater's monthly "midnight screenings," and through problems in stirring interest in the theatrical release.
