= Kumar Sanu discography and filmography =

Discography and filmography of Indian singer Kumar Sanu

Kumar Sanu is an Indian playback singer, working primarily in Hindi films, he also sings in many other Indian languages, including English, Marathi, Assamese, Bhojpuri, Gujarati, Telugu, Malayalam, Kannada, Tamil, Punjabi, Oriya, Chhattisgarhi, Urdu, Pali, and his native language, Bengali.

== Hindi Albums songs ==
Year	Albums	Song name(s)	Co-singer(s)	Music director(s)	Lyricist
1989	Do Ghoont	"Do Ghoont Pila De","Uth Jayein Agar Sab","Hum Kisi Guzre Hue","Meri Nazar P Hawas","Mujhe Le To Chalo"	Kavita Krishnamurthy, Solo	Pandit K. Razdan	Pandit K. Razdan
1991	Aap Ki Yaadein	"Aap Se Achi Apki Yaadein"	Anuradha Paudwal	Nadeem-Shravan	Various
1991	Hum To Pyaar Karenge	"O Mitwa Door Woh Zameen Pe"	Babul Bose	Anuradha Paudwal	Ravinder Rawal
1992	Yaa Ali Madad	"Maula Ki Mohabbat"	Solo	Qaiser	Ghulam Ali
1992	The Tiger Of India	"Chehra Kya Dekhte Ho","Socheinge Tumhe","Sunle Zamana","Roshni Andhera Mitathi Hai","Doewa Nani","O Jane Janam","Aisa Anari Mile","Dil Ka Kya Kasoor","Is Pyar Se Meri Taraf","O Laal Dupatte Wali"	Solo, Rachna Baithali, Sharda Deokhi, Marcel van Buuren	Glenn Gaddum	
1992	Kahkashan	"Janewale Sipahi Se Poocho"	Solo	Jagjit Singh	Makhdoom Mohiuddin
1992	Rang Badalta Hai Jahan	"Rang Badalta Hai Jahan","Baith Ke Dil Mein Kisi Din","Tere Mere Naam Naye Hai","Cham Cham Karti Aayi","Neel Gagan Mein","Kuchbhi Bacha Na","Unko Bhi Humse"	Solo, Alka Yagnik	Usha Khanna	Nida Fazli
1992	Hum Hain Tumhare	"Tum Ek Baar Mujhe","Maine Tujhe Dil Diya","Jaanam Sajde Kiye"	Rachana, Bela Sulakhe	Gautam Dasgupta	
1992	Sapne Hue Na Apne	"Tere Khayalon Mein"	Kavita Krishnamurthy	Ghulam Ali	
1992	Bewafa Aashiq	"O Dil Thod Ke","Tujhe Bhoolna To Chaha","Qarar Pa Na Sake","Main Duniya Teri"	Solo, Kavita Krishnamurthy, Sadhana Sargam	Ravi Pawar	Rani Malik
1993	Phoolon Ke Zakhm	"Main Apni Gareebi","Ay Dil Iska Gham Na Kar","Tu Bhi Keh De Sanam","Pyar Maine Kiya"	Alka Yagnik	Anand–Milind	Sameer
1993	Spirit of Love	"Dil Le Le","Ek Ladki Pyari Pyari","Mujhe Pyar Karna Sikhaya","Mujhse Kab Milogi","Jis Modh Se Guzre Thy","Local Train Se Jana Hai","Pyar Kya Hai","Mere Paas Aaoo"	Solo	Various	Various
1993	Maine Pee Hai	"Honton Se Jab Lagaye","Na Chhode Sath Jo","Peete Hi Jisko Aaye Maza","Ye Khumari Hai Sharab Ki"	Kavita Krishnamurthy, Solo	Manoj Mahesh	Manoj Mahesh
1993	Teri Mohabbat Mein	"Teri Judaai Mein","Yeh Baharein Yeh Nazare","Aye Sanam Tumhi","Tum Jab Bhi Khat","Padh Kar Tumhara Khat","Dil De Chuke Hain","Bhoola Chuka Hoon Zamana","Raatein Hain Iqraar Ki","Kya Yunhi Mere"	Solo	Nadeem-Shravan	Nafees Alam
1993	Dil Tere Naam	"Baat Jo Dil Me Chupi","Betab Hai Dil","Kal Raat Koi Mere","Suron Ki Yeh Ganga","Tere Hi Sur Mein","Tu Na Bhale Chahe Mujhe"	Kavita Krishnamurthy, Solo	Arup - Pranay	Shyam Raj, Shyam Anuragi, Yogesh, Hasrat Jaipuri,
1993	Maa Ke Charnon Mein	"Hai Shastra Hathon Mein"	solo	Sailesh Bharti	
1993	Maa Ke Charnon Mein	"Sona Chandi Na Maangu"	Bela Sulakhe	Sailesh Bharti	
1994	Dil Deewangi	"Dekhte Hi Dekhte Hi"	Solo	Rais Bharatya	Anwar Sagar
1994	Jaane Baharan	"Jaan-E-Bahaaran","Pyar Bhare Do Sharmile","Tu Jo Nahi Hai To","Dekh Edher Aik Nazar","Muhabat Zindagi Hai Aur Tum","Chand Taare Ghata Phool Shabnam","Kuch Log Rooth Kar Bhi"	Solo		
1994	Kishore Ki Yaadein	"Zindagi Ka Safar (Safar)"	solo	various	various
1994	Kishore Ki Yaadein	"Dil Aaj Shair Hai (Gambler)"	solo	various	various
1994	Kishore Ki Yaadein	"Dil Aisa Kisi Ne Mera Toda (Amanush)"	solo	various	various
1994	Kishore Ki Yaadein	"Diye Jalte Hain (Namak Haraam)"	solo	various	various
1994	Kishore Ki Yaadein	"Ghungroo Ki Tarah (Chor Machaye Shor)"	solo	various	various
1994	Kishore Ki Yaadein	"Hamein Timse Pyar Kitna (Kudrat)"	solo	various	various
1994	Kishore Ki Yaadein	"Jab Dard Nahin Tha (Anurodh)"	solo	various	various
1994	Kishore Ki Yaadein	"Kuchh To Log Kahenge (Amar Prem)"	solo	various	various
1994	Kishore Ki Yaadein	"Teri Duniya Se (Pavitra Paapi)"	solo	various	various
1994	Kishore Ki Yaadein	"Pal Pal Dile Ke Paas (Black Mail)"	solo	various	various
1994	Kishore Ki Yaadein	"O Saathi Re (Muqaddar ka Sikandar)"	solo	various	various
1994	Kishore Ki Yaadein	"Mere Naseeb Mein Ae Dost (Do Raaste)"	solo	various	various
1994	Kishore Ki Yaadein	"Mera Jeevan Kora Kagaz (Kora Kagaz)"	solo	various	various
1994	Kishore Ki Yaadein	"Zindagi ka Safar Mein (Aap Ki Kasam)"	solo	various	various
1994	"Mere Naina Sawan Bhado (Mehbooba)"				
1994	"O Manjhi Re (Khushboo)"				
1994	Sweet Heart	"Jane Mann O Jane Jaan Aao Na"	Solo	Vidyut Goswami	Gemrah Khiyanti
1994	Aankhon Se Dil Tak	"Aankhon Mein Apni Humko","Har Ek Zarre Pe","Laal Chodiyan"	Solo	Jwala Prashad	Nawab Badayuni, Rani Malik
1995	Bedardi Sanam	"Tere Hathon Ki Mehndi", "Khoye Khoye Rehte Ho"	Solo, Sadhana Sargam	Jolly Mukherjee	Various
1995	Saaz Aur Aawaaz	"Meri Zindagi Ki Har Khushi Ho Tum","Teri Aashiqui Ka"	Solo	Sonik-Omi	Naqsh Lyallpuri
1995	City Of 1000 Dreams Bombay	"City Of 1000 Dreams Bombay"	Kavita Krishnamurthy, Gosh	Danial Choranji Sabrai	P.T Kiran Mishra
1995	Rootho Na Hasina	"Jab Se Sanam Hum Apka Deedar Karne Lage Hain"	Solo		
1995	Juhi	"Tu Bewafa Nahin"	Kavita Krishnamurthy	Devang Patel	Anjum
1995	Saajan Ke Liye	"Tu Sapno Ki Tasveer", "Tumhi Ne Rang Bhare"	Kavita Krishnamurthy	Bappi Lahiri	Anwar Sagar, Nawab Arzoo
1995	Sharab Aur Shabab	"Title Song"	Kavita Krishnamurthy	Dilip Verman	
1996	Humsafar	"Kal Sadak Pe Chalte Chalte","Nagma Tera Badan Chehra Ghazal","Teri Payal Ki Kasam"	Solo, Alka Yagnik	Babu Kishen	Shaheen Iqbal
1996	Crucial Jam – The Album	"Yeh Kajli Chandni Jab"	Alka Yagnik	Rhythm Squad and EWC	
1996	Crucial Jam – The Album	"Premi Aashiq Awara"	Alka Yagnik	Rhythm Squad and EWC	
1996	Crucial Jam – The Album	"Yeh Dua Hai Meri Rabse"	Alka Yagnik	Rhythm Squad and EWC	
1996	Crucial Jam – The Album	"Dil Jigar Nazar Kya"	solo	Rhythm Squad and EWC	
1996	Crucial Jam – The Album	"Kitna Pyaar Hum Tumhe Karte Hai"	Sadhana Sargam	Rhythm Squad and EWC	
1996	Kunika Lakhon Mein Ek	"Suna Suna Lagta Hai"	Kunika Lal	Chittoo Singh	
1996	Shiv Parvati	"Ayi Milan Ki Bela"	Asha Bhosle	Sharang Dev	
1996	Princess Takhmina	"Tohre Ke Liye"	Alka Yagnik	Ajay Swami	Dr Anand Khare
1996	Kuch Na Kuch To Baat Hai	"Ye Deewana Tera"	Solo	Satyaprakash Mangtani	Kohli Surender
1996	Zara Hat Ke	"Phoolon Jaisa Pyar Tumhara"	Solo	Babu Kishan	
1996	Jiye Jaa	Na Socho","Mere Dil Mein","Jiye Jaa","Dil Ke Pass Tu","Aayee Hai Bahar","Aao Hum Pyar Karen","Aajana Dheere","Aaja Tu"	Solo	S. Doelam	
1996	Fantasy ll	"Ha Tere Liye","Dil Se Khelne Wale","Dil Se Khelne Wale","Bhigi Bhigi","Aankhya Dolan Baar Baar","Shadi Ka Tera","Main Dil","Jaldi Se Aja","Jabse Huyi Jawan Tu"	Solo, Menka	Shastri D. & Dara D.	Shyam Raj
1996	Tumhare Liye - Monalisa	"Yeh Pyar Ki Yeh","Monalisa I Love You","Mausam Hai Pyar Ka","Kal Ki Hasin Mulakat Mein","Kabhi Kabhi Tasveer Banke","Jab Na Rahenge Hum","Gore Mukhde Se","Ae Khat Mere Yaar Se"	Kavita Krishnamurthy, Solo, Mitali Chaudhary	Ismail Khan	
1996	Karo Itni Mohabbat Sanam	"Dil Mein Rehti Ho Tum","Kaliyon Ke Gunghat","Karo Itni Mohabbat Sanam","Meri Bahon Mein Tum","Tune Kaha Hai Na","Yeh Raat Hai"	Alka Yagnik, Solo	Mickey Gupta	Rani Malik
1996	Tera Ghunghta	"Tera Ghunghta Jo Hata"	Solo	Babu Kishan	Abdul Wali Khan
1996	Juhi	"Tu Bewafa Nahi"	Kavita Krishnamurthy	Devang Patel	
1996	Sajni	"Dil Mein Tum Dhadkan Mein Tum"	Suchandra	Nadeem-Shravan	Sameer
1996	Woh Bura Maan Gaye	"Jaana Nehi Mere Dil Se"	solo	Jaspal Moni	Dhruv Khanna
1996	Woh Bura Maan Gaye	"Dil Ki Kitab Par Ke"	solo	Jaspal Moni	Dhruv Khanna
1996	Simply Love	"Hum Mil Ke Chalenge","Yeh Aashiqui Hai Meri","Mujhe Tu Jo Mili"	Kavita Krishnamurthy, Solo	Danny Choranji	Dev Kohli
1996	O Haseena	"Ek Ladki Boli Dil Dedo"	Solo	Babu Kishen	Sunil Jha
1996	Romantica 2	"Kismat Ki Baat Hai","Han Wo Shaher","Dol Dol Ki","Hai Aaj Hi Zindagi","Tum Ho Hum Hain","Bheegi Bheegi Si Raat","Bin Jane Hi"	Solo	Shastri D. & Data D.	
1997	Pagla Kahin Ka	"Bechain Thy Naina Mere"	Anuradha Paudwal	Bhushan Dua	Tabun Sutradhar
1997	Baharon Phool Barsao	"Baharon Phool Barsao","Ek Tu Ko Mili"	Solo	G.A Khan	
1997	Roses Are Red 3	"Tumko Liye Bahoon Mein","Tumko Liye Bahoon Mein (Mix)","Dil Kyoon Dharak Raha Hai"	Anupama Deshpande	Satish Kochhar	
1997	Dil Ne Kya Kaha	"Bohot Khubsurot Ho Tum","Dil Se Dil Ne Jane","O Berehem O Bewafa","Lagta Nahi Hai Dil","Kya Hua Kya Kahun","Dekha Tumhe Ho Gaya","Yeh Teri Aankhen","Tum Samne Baithi Raho"	Solo	Ghulam Ali	Nawab Arzoo
1997	Churalia Nigahon Se	"Aankhon Ki Meri Neend","Teri Aankhon Mein Meri","Ek Pal Jiya Nahin Jaye","Ek Ladki Mujhe Mili","Chori Chori Yaar Kare Hai","Yeh Kya Hua Mujhe Ko Sanam"	Kavita Krishnamurthy, Solo	Jay Vijay	
1997	Jawan Dil	"Duniya Badal Gayi Hai","Umar Hai Kam Masti Hai","Aa Bhi Ja Jane Jana","Main Jawan Tum Jawan","Suna Hai Pyar"," Sun Mere Dil","Milte Hi Unse Nazar","Har Gham Chupa Kar"	Solo	Kanu Bhattacharya	Dev Kumar Pandey
1998	Masoom Tera Chehra	"Dil Banjara Pyar Ka Maara","Dil Toota Mera Dil","Masoom Tera Chehra"	Solo	Shyamraj & Madan Pal	Aadesh Shrivastava
1998	Bollywood Remix Nakhrewali: Volume 1	"Apni Toh Jaise Taise"			solo
1998	Bollywood Remix Nakhrewali: Volume 1	"Bachna Ae Hasino"			solo
1998	Bollywood Remix Nakhrewali: Volume 1	"Chala Jaata Hoon"			solo
1998	Bollywood Remix Nakhrewali: Volume 1	"Khaike Pan Banaras Wala"			solo
1998	Bollywood Remix Nakhrewali: Volume 1	"Kitne Bhi Tu Karle Sitam"			solo
1998	Bollywood Remix Nakhrewali: Volume 1	"Mere Sapno Ki Rani Kab"			solo
1998	Bollywood Remix Nakhrewali: Volume 1	"Nakhrewali Dekhne Mein"			solo
1998	Bollywood Remix Nakhrewali: Volume 1	"O Mere Dil Ke Chain"			solo
1998	Bollywood Remix Nakhrewali: Volume 1	"Palbhar Ke Liye Koi"			solo
1998	Bollywood Remix Nakhrewali: Volume 1	"Pyar Deewana Hota Hai"			solo
1998	Bollywood Remix Nakhrewali: Volume 1	"Yeh Dil Na Hota Bechara"			solo
1998	Yeh Dosti	"Sun Yaar Mere","Ek Ladki Daily Mujhko"	Udit Narayan, Deepa Narayan	Asad Ajmeri	Ghulam Ali
1998	Love Story 98	"Main Kapde Badal Ke","Meri Pahli Tammana Tum Ho"	Solo	Bappi Lahiri	Anwar Sagar, Dipak
1998	Baby Love Me	"Baby Love Me O Baby Love Me", "Deewana Ho Jane Do Mastana Ho Jane Do", "Dekha Tha Maine Chand Ko", "Kudiye Tu Namkeen Badi", "Tak Dhin Tak Dhin Tak Dhin", "Tasveer Se Teri Behlega Ab Na Yeh Dil", "Woh Pehli Nazar Woh Pehla Asar"	Solo	Shastri D	Sham Raj
1999	Dil Kahin Hosh Kahin	"Tum Se Milkar"	Solo	Nida Fazli	Aadesh Shrivastava
1999	Pudi Kachawri Achar Ho	"Tujhe Chaha Tha Maine","Saara Zamana"	Basanta Kumar, Solo	Basanta Kumar & Kartick Kumar	Shakil Ahmed
2000	Sadma-Sentimental Ghazals	"Ajeeb Hota Hai Manzar", "Bahar Aayee Hai", "Kisi Ki Yaad Sataye", "Kya Kahoon Main Tumhein", "Masoom Dil Ke Dard", "Na Kabhi Wafa Karunga", "Pee Kar Sharab Roh Liye"	Solo	Jeetu Tapan	Razdan K
2000	Nasha	"Zindegi Tujhko Naye","Waqt Ne Humse","Sharab Pee Pee Kar","Sharab Pee Lena","Nazar Milayee Tumne","Na Kabhi Wafaa Karunga","Koyee Na Geet Pyar Ki","Kis Se Baat Karen"	Solo	Jeetu - Tapan	Pandit K. Razdan
2000	Kehna To Hai	"Aao Tumko Ghar", "Dheere Dheere Pyar Mein Hum Tum", "Is Janam Mein Tera Pyar", "Kehna To Hai Kaise Kahoon", "Khai Hai Chahat Ki Kasmein", "Kya Tum Wohi Ho", "Saathi Mere Jeena Hai Mushkil Mera Tere Bina", "Sun Haseena Sun"	Solo	Rajesh Roshan	Dev Kohli
2000	Pyari Si Ek Ladki	"Pyari Si Ek Ladki","Dil Ko Kahan Raha","Tu Hai Kidhar","Tere Pyar Mein","Kaise Tujhe Main"	Solo, Sujata .B	S Doelam	S. Raj
2000	Ek Hi Jaam	"Sagar Likha Hai"	Solo	Tapas, Babun	Satish Tiwari
2001	Kaise Kahoon	"Kaise Kahoon","Tu Khwab Hai","Khoya Hai Humne","Jaadu Kiya Kya","Main Jahan Jahan","Dil Mein Kisi Ke","Bahon Mein Aaja","Sawan Ayaa"	Solo	Kumar Sanu	Shyam Raj
2002	Love 2002	"Honton Pe Aa Raha Hai"	Anuradha Paudwal	Ghulam Ali Chander	Suroor Lucknowi
2002	Great Target	"Don Don You Are Don"	Solo	Ghulam Ali	Rajiv Ranjan Singh
2003	Aap Se Humein Pyaar Ho Gaya Hai	"Aap Se Humein Pyar Ho Gaya Hai"	Solo	Babar Bokhari	Babar Bhokhari
2004	Mere Mehboob	"Tham Ke Baras", "Ghabra Ke Ab"	Solo	Nice Music India. Ltd.	Nice Music India. Ltd.
2004	Mila Pyar Tera (Illusions)	"Teri Payal","Phoolon Mein","Nazar Nazar","Mila Pyar Tera","Mausam Hai","Leke Aaye Zindagi","Hota Hai Pyar","Bahut Dinon Tak"	Solo, Poornima	Nikhil-Vinay	
2004	Hottest M@il.Com	"Main Jo Tumko Chahoon","Main Jo Tumko Chahoon(Part 2)	Jyoti	Latif Shaikh	
2004	Ladki Hindustani	"Tum Tum Tara"	Solo	Babu Kishen	Babu Kishen
2004	Tera Mera Pyar	"Tera Mera Pyar", "Aankhon Se"	Solo, Alka Yagnik	Kumar Sanu	Kumar Sanu
2005	Aise Na Dekho Mujhe	"Aise Na Dekho Mujhe","Bahon Mein Aao","Dekha Tujhko To","Dhere Se Chupke Se","Dil Nashe Mein Choor Hai","Dil Se Kabhi Na Jana","Hamari Dhadkan Mein","Majbuyan Meri Bhi Thi","Raat Kat Ti Nahi","Tumse Nazre Mili"	Solo	Shibu Pintu, Kumar Sanu	Nusrat Badr, Sahil Sultanpuri
2005	Kajra Nite	"Pal Pal Dil Ke Paas","Apni To Jaise Taise"	Solo	DJ Akbar Sami	
2005	Aaya Bihu Jhoom Ke	"Naye Naye Rangon Mein","Aaye Gaye Kai Haseen"	Sadhana Sargam, Sunidhi Chauhan	Dony Hazarika	
2005	Pardesia 2 (Remix)	"Log Kehte Hain","Abke Sawan Mein"	Duet	Harry Anand	
2006	Dil Ne Tujhe Chaha	"Paas Aao Na","Teri Aankhon Mei Dil Hai Mera"	Duet & Solo	Latif Shaikh	Hans Patel
2006	Tirupati Shri Balaji	"Moti Chhupe Hue Hai"	Sadhana Sargam	Bhushan Kumar	
2006	Tirupati Shri Balaji	"Aaja Aaja Priyatama"	Sadhana Sargam	Bhushan Kumar	
2006	Nasha	"Thodi Si Hai Ye Duniya","Kahe Akhiyo Se Maare","Tu Shive Ko Jal Chhadane"	Solo, Indar Kanhai	Kumar Sanu	Sahil Sultanpuri
2006	Mashooqa	"Hote Hote Pyar Ho Gaya","Tum Bin Jab Raat Hogi","Dhere Dhere Rafta Rafta","Dil Dewana","Surma Surma Mohabbat Ka","Wadon Se Na Chale"	Alka Yagnik, Solo	Bappi Lahiri	Sameer
2006	Soniye I Love You	"Inayat Karoge","O Piya"	Kalpana	Nayab - Raja	Junaid
2007	Yeh Meri Deewaangi	"Yeh Meri Deewaangi", " Abhi Zindagi Se Gila To Nahi"	Solo	Nayab Raja	Pravin Bheda
2008	Apne Watan Se Door	"Tera Chehra Is Qadar","Pal Pal Mujhe O Sanan","Pal Pal Mujhe O Sanam(Sad)","Kudian Kudian","Khwabon Ka Ashiyan","Mere Khwabon Ko"	Solo	Kumar Sanu	Suraj Kumar
2008	Pyar Kya Hota Hai	"Na Keh Do To"	Solo	Laxmi Vasant	
2008	Kushal Yuva	"Badlo","Nao Jawan Hum"	Solo		Sudhakar Sharma
2008	Khuda Ki Raah Mein	"Woh Khuda Hai","Tu Pyar Aapna Deke Mujhe","Uski Hai Jisne Yeh","Sham Saher Tu Yaad Khuda Kar","Mere Khuda Mujhe","Main Nahi Mohtaj","Jab Tu Khuda Se","Ae Khuda Tu Mera"	Solo	Sayed Ahmed	Anjaan Sagri
2008	Gold Resort	"Mausam Jiska Deewana Hai"	Solo	Bappi Lahiri	Minu Singh
2008	Ja Nanna	"Ja Nanna"	Abresham	Kasim Azhar	Aisha Moin
2008	Ja Nanna	"Doori" (version 1)	Abresham	Kasim Azhar	Aisha Moin
2008	Ja Nanna	"Doori" (version 2)	Abresham	Kasim Azhar	Aisha Moin
2008	Kuch Kaho Na	"Kuch Kaho Na","Raatein"	Anuradha Paudwal	Nayab Raza	Rashid Feroabadi
2009	Fusion	"Dekhun Raat Din Tere Sapne", "Dil Ki Baat", "Dil Tujhe De Diya", "Don't Go Away", "Khamosh Hum", "Mohabbat Mein Itne Kareeb", "Tune Chhua", "Udti Hawaon"	Solo	Nayaab Raja	Pravin Bheda
2009	Nasha Reloaded	"Zara Wo Sharmati Hai", "Ankhon Ankhon Mein Tum"	Solo	Indar Kanhai	
2009	Yeh Laal Ramg	"Ajnabi Tum Kahe"	solo	various	various
2009	Yeh Laal Ramg	"Zindegi Ka Safar Hai Yeh"	solo	various	various
2009	Yeh Laal Ramg	"Ye Laal Rang Kab Mujhe"	solo	various	various
2009	Yeh Laal Ramg	"Tum Bin Jaun "	solo	various	various
2009	Yeh Laal Ramg	"Pyar Deewana Hota Hai"	solo	various	various
2009	Yeh Laal Ramg	"Mere Mehboob Qayamat Hogi"	solo	various	various
2009	Yeh Laal Ramg	"Koi Hum Dum Na Raha"	solo	various	various
2009	Yeh Laal Ramg	"Jeevan Ke Safar Mein"	solo	various	various
2009	Yeh Laal Ramg	"Dukhi Man Mere"	solo	various	various
2009	Yeh Laal Ramg	"Dil Aaj Shayer Hai"	solo	various	various
2010	Heart 2 Heart	"Lamha Ho Tum"	Solo	Sankar - Saikat	
2010	Single Song	"Camerey Do Aankhon Ke"	Mohammad Salamat, Khailash Kher	Vijay Verma	
2011	Dil Ki Tadap	"Gagan Ke Chand"	Solo	Droan	
2011	Mohabbat The Taj	"Swaagatam"	Alka Yagnik		
2011	An Unconditional Love	"Kahan Aa Gaye Hum"	Solo	Bhupinder Singh	Azad Jalandhari
2011	Kis Raaste	"Lamha Ye"	Solo	Shekhar Hemnani	
2011	Tera Deewana	"Wo Mere Samne Se"	Solo	Basant	Basant, Durgesh Khot
2012	Return of Aashiqui	"Aaj mere dil ne", "Aap Ko chahata Hu", "Chehara to Lag raha hai", "Ek bat kahe Tumse", "Mane Na Kahana", "Mai deewana Ho gaya", "O mere Sanam"	Solo, Alka Yagnik, Indu Chikate, Anuradha Singh	A.P Mishra	A.P Mishra
2012	Watan Ke Geet	"Ho Gayi Hai Sham Chalo"	Solo		
2012	K Tere Bin	"K Tere Bin", "Aapse Milke", "Kaise Jitein Hain", "Main Chup Hun", "Mane Na Kahana", "Mujhe Pagal Kar Diya", "Rab Se Bhi Pyara", "Yun To Ashman Pe"	Solo, Mistu Bardhan	Anand Mishra	Anand Mishra
2012	Boondein Pyar Ki	"Aa Gaye Din Aise"	Solo	Vinod Bhatt	Vinod Bhatt
2012	Gal Sun	"Gal Sun"	Asha Bhosle	Jinx	
2013	Kabhi Kabhi Aisa Bhi Hota	"Saagar Si Teri Aankhon Mein"	Rekha Rao	Vishnu Narayan	Uday Pankaj
2014	Hum Aur Tum	"Jaan E Jaan", "Kya Yahi Pyar Hai", "Yeh Wada Raha", "Ankhon Ankhon Mein", "Tum Mile Pyar Se", " Hum Aur Tum", "Kora Kagaz Tha", " Suno Kaho Kaha Suno", "Pyar Hua Hai Jab Se", "Pana Ki Tamana", "Acha Hum To Chalty Hain", "Tum Aa Gay Ho","Tere Bina Zindagi Se Koi Shikwa"	Solo, Almas Noor	Jatin Sharma, Shruti Vohra	Various
2014	Amor	"Tu Aras Mi", "Ek Masoom Ladki", "Sapne Mein Bhi", "Tere Bin", " Marta Hoon Tum Pe", " Wo Ho Na Ho", "Mujhe Rab Ne Di"	Solo	Sahib.G And Kaykay	Kishan Paliwar (Hindi), Ana K Sanu (Spanish)
2014	Dheere	"Dheere Dheere Se (Rimix)"	F T Khiza	Zack Knight	Zack Knight
2014	Rang Lini Re	"Rang Lini Re"	Alka Yagnik	Kumar Sanu	Sudhakar Sharma
2014	Aarzoo	"Teri Aarzo Ka Deya", "Badal Raha Hai"	Solo	Rosaro & Surendra	Dr.Surekha Suhani
2014	Singles	"Saanson Ki","Guzri Hui Zindahgi"	Solo, Alka Yagnik	Tapas Mitra	Vijay
2015	Aisa Kyun Lagta Hai	"Aisa Kyun Lagta Hai"	Solo	Anand Mishra	Anand Mishra
2015	Apalak	"Tarekhein Badlengi Din Ye Guzrenge"	Shipla B.Roy	Kyle Mitra	Usha Subhash Dangayach
2015	Rag Rag Mein Base Bhimraj	"Tinka Tinka Chunkar"	Solo	Kiran Raj	Susil Yelwe
2015	Mohabbat Ki Guzarish	"Title Song"	Solo	Nripanshu Shekhar	Krishnadeep Kar
2015	TUM HI TUM	"TUM HI TUM"	Solo	Sahib G and Kaykay	Ajay Chandran
2015	Teri Yaadein	"Teri Yaadein"	Solo	Davindra Kainth	Anand Mishra
2015	Chapter V	"Har Pal"	Solo	DJ Vix	Saabi Onkar
2016	Yeh Pyar Mein Aksar Hota Hai	"Pyar Me Aksar"	Khushbu Jain	Kumar Sanu	Chandra Surya
2016	Jashan Ki Raat	"Jashan Ki Raat Hai"	Sunidhi Chauhan	Bappi Lahiri	Sameer
2016	Ek Ladki Phool Si	"Ek Ladki"	Solo	Shiv-Hari	Kumar Sanu
2016	Milti Hai Jab	"Milti Hai Jab"	Solo	Kumar Sanu	
2016	Love In Kashmir	"Aaj Kal Khwab","Dil Ki Dhadkan Mein","Aise Na Mujhe Dekha Karo"	Solo	Rakesh Sawant	Rakesh Sawant
2016	Single Track	"Biriyani"	Rakesh Sawant	Rakesh Sawant	Rakesh Sawant
2016	Single Track	"Use Dekh ke Aisa Lagta hai"	Kumar Sanu	Unknown	Sahil Sultanpuri
2016	Zindagi Ban Gaye Ho Tum	"O Priya Tune Kaisa"	Duet	Damodar Rao	Damodar Rao
2016	Dard... First Love Neve Ends	"Bechain Ratein","Dil Mein Kahin"	Solo	Vijay Verma	Jalees Sherwani
2016	Dil Mei Hai Pyar	"Chup Gaya Dil"	Solo	Khagen Mahanta	Kumar Krishna
2016	Aanchal Pe	"Aanchal Pe Aa"	Moumita Roy	Nilakash Roy	
2016	Tanha Safar	"Tanha Safar Mein Tum"	Nidhi Shirivastava	Shahdaab-Koshy	Sanjay Mishra
2017	Tum Mile	"Tum Mile Jabse Mujhe"	Solo	Kumar Sanu	Anand Mishra
2017	Tu Zindagi Hai	"Ro Raha Dil"	Duet	Nizam Pradeep	Nizam Sultanpuri
2017	Pagal Ashiq	"Jinhe Hum Chahe Dil Se"	solo	Nizam Pradeep	
2017	Salute To My Hero	"Wo Fizaon Mein Bikar Jayega"	Mishtu Bardhan & Solo	Sayed Ahmed	Azeim Malik
2017	Single Song	"Nasheeli Aankhon Ko"	Anwesha	Tona Gautam	Gautam Sarkar
2017	Single Song	"Dil Bhi Hai Aur Dard Bhi"	Solo	Suman Acharjee	Suman Acharjee
2017	Baba Sai	"Re Bandiya Wey Lele Dua"	Solo	Rakesh	Rakesh
2017	Tere Pyar Mein	"Title Song", "Tere Bina" & "Zindagi Sooni Padi" Hai	Solo	Amjad Hossain	Amjad Hossain
2017	Tum Bin	"Baahon Mein Aa Zara*, "Kaise Kehdun O Jaane Jaana"	Madhumita Chatterjee	Samir Chatterjee	Rajiv Datta
2018	Mann Ke Taar	"Title Song"	Saswati Adhikari	Rajesh Sharma	Zahir Anwar
2018	Bolo Tum Ko Mujhse Pyar Hai	"Title Song"	Amrita Nayak	Ahsan Bharti	Saajan
2018	It's Magical	"It's Magical"	Shannon K.	Daniel Boddu	Sameer
2018	Unknown	"Tu Sirf Tu","O Sanam Tu Mera" & "Tere Bin Ab Nahi Lagta"	Suparna Gosh	Sarbarish	Samo
2018	Dil Mein Ho Tum	"Dil Mein Ho Tum"	Solo	Sitangshu Majumder	Shelley Chakraborty
2018	In Hawaon Ne	"Title Song"	Alka Yagnik	Waseem Khan	Waseem Khan
2018	Aasra	"Mera Aasra Hai Jhoota"	Solo	Nizam Pradeep	Manoj Kumar Shree Vastav
2018	Tanhaiyan	"Ek To Safar Mein", "Jitni Hum Aaj", "Ye Meri To", "Gham Jo Agar", "Aynge Kitne Diwane", "Tu Kaisi Ho"	Solo	Sitangshu Majumder	Abinash Verma
2018	Jab Bhi Yeh Dil	"Jab Bhi Yeh Dil"	Ashim Kumar Bhattacharya	Krishnadeep Kaur	solo
2018	Jab Bhi Yeh Dil	"Aaj Bhi"	Ashim Kumar Bhattacharya	Krishnadeep Kaur	solo
2018	Single Romantic Song	"Mere Khayalon Mein"	Solo	Avijit Mondal	Avijit Mondal
2019	Single Track	"Tujhe Dekha To Ye (New Version)"	Solo	Srideep Das	Anushree Roy
2019	Chal Soniye	"Aaja Ve Chal Soniye"	Solo	Munna Dhari	Sudhakar Sharma
2019	Madhosh Teri Aankhen	"Dil Kehta Hai"			solo
2019	Tere Bina Kaise Jiyun	"Tere Bina Kaise Jiyun"	Ankita Das	Rup Bhattacharya	Rup Bhattacharya
2019	Mere Shyam	"Title Song"	Solo	Tabun Sutradhar	
2019	Unknown	"Chahat Ka Asman", "Mastana Mastana", "Tu Hai Sanam", "Har Gadi Kisi Ka Intezar"	Suparna Ghosh, Sureli	Sarbarish Mazumder	Soma
2019	Hum Hain U.P Police	"Title Song"	Solo	Hirju Roy	Ravi Yadav
2019	Yaar Mera	"Title Song"	Tushar Verma	Sameer Khole	Sanjaye Mishra
2019	Lehrao Tiranga Pyaara	"Title Song"	Solo	Rosario Dsouza	Gulab Anand
2019	Yaara O Yaara	"Title Song"	Solo	Akhilesh Kumar	Amar Kumar
2019	Tumra Na Jayo	"Title Song"	Ritu Zied	Ritu Zied	VSY
2019	Bheega Badan O Sanam	"Title Song"	Kavita Krishnamurthy	Prodip Kumar	Chakra Bulandshahe
2019	FLAMES-Season2	"Khamoshiyan"	Alka Yagnik	Lalit Pandit	Alok Ranjha Jha
2019	Ishq Saaf	"Title Song"	Payal Dev	Meet Bros	Shabbir Ahmed (lyricist)
2019	Mausam Hai Haseen	"Title Song"	Ratna Roy		
2019	Kal Tak Jahan Aisa Na Tha	"Title Song"	Alka Yagnik	Raj Sen	Niranjan Bhudhadhar
2019	Gardish Mein Taare	"Adhuri Si Hain Kuch Hasratein"	Solo	Parivesh Singh	Parivesh Singh
2020	Tu Pyar Hai Kisi Aur Ka	"Title Song(Recreate)"	Solo	Srideep Das	Anuj Bhowmik
2020	Ab Ke To Sawan Mein	"Title Song"	Arpitha Nath,	Dilip Dutta	Deepak Sneh,
2020	Dil Nasheen	"Tum Dil Nasheen"	Solo	Asheem Mangoli	Asheem Mangoli & Guncharan Singh
2020	Suno Apne Dil Ki	"Suno Apne Dil Ki"	Solo	D.J Sheizwood	DJ Sheizwood
2020	Jeevan Ka Maqsad	"Title Song"	Solo	Dr.Amit Kamle	Dr.Amit Kamle
2020	Seene Se Lag Ke	"Title Song"	Alka Yagnik	Raj Sen	Niranjan Budhadhara
2020	Sanam Tujhko	"Sanam Tujhko"	Gautami Roy	Subhasish Bhattacharya	Shyam Raj
2020	Jammin'	"Muskurane Ki Waja","Tu Mile Dil Khile","Tujhe Dekha To","Ae Kash Ke Hum"	Bhavya Pandit		
2020	Pakistani Ho Ya Indian	"Title Song"	Solo	Luv Kush	Sudhakar Sharma
2021	Ek Zindagi Ek Dosti	"Title Song"	Solo	Pallab Mondal	Pallab Mondal
2021	OH Jaana	"Title Song"	Solo	Ali Khan Roomani	Ali Khan Roomani
2021	O Sanam	"Title Song"	Sapna Ratwa	Anand Mishra	Anand Mishra
2021	Ek Ajnabee	"Title Song"	Navneet Kaur	Anand Mishra	Anand Mishra
2021	Super Sitara	"Humnavva Humsafar"	Alka Yagnik	Himesh Reshammiya	Sameer Anjaan
2021	Tum Hamnawa Ho Mere	"Title Song"	Solo	Vinay Kapadia	Kuldeep Panday
2021	Tu Khuda Ho Gaya	"Title Song"	Solo	Vinay Kapadia	Kuldeep Panday
2021	Tu Meri Arzoo	"Title Song"	Gautami Roy	Subasish Bhattacharya	Shyam Raj
2021	Rota Nahin Tha Main	"Title Song"	Solo	Swaraj Vaishnav	Swaraj Vaishnav
2021	Mujhe Chhod Kar	"Title Song"	Solo	Pinaki Chatterjee	Pinaki Chatterjee
2021	Saawariya	"Title Song"	Aastha Gill	Aditya Dev	Dilwala
2021	Tujhe Chahne Ki Chah Mein	"Title Song"	Solo	Baba Jagirdar	Rajesh Sangwani
2021	Mere Dil Ki Guzarish	"Title Song"	Solo	Aarv	Niranjan Bhudhadhara
2022	Dil Kisi Aur Par Nahin Aata (90s Unreleased)	"Title Song"	Kavita Krishnamurthy	Anu Malik	
2022	Mujhko Wo Mil Payi Na	"Title Song"	Solo	Nizam Pradeep	Nizam Sultanpuri
2022	Teri Yaadein	"Teri Yaadon Mein"	Reshma Ramesh	Chinar-Mahesh	Pankaj Mandalik
2022	Mohabbat Mein Tere Sanam	"Title Song"	Kshitij Vedi & Diksha Sameria	Vaibhav Saxena	Gunjan Jha
2022	Chiti Chhadi Pahad Pe	"Title Song"	Solo	Rais Bharti	Rais Bharti
2022	Tu Hi To Hai Duniya Meri	"Title Song"	Rajvi Khan		
2022	Ye Ishq Aur Ye Barish	"Title Song	Anuradha Paudwal	Sarbarish Mazumdar	Syed Jilani
2022	Choti Si Hai Meri Iltija	"Title Song"	Anuradha Paudwal	Sarbarish Mazumdar	Syed Jilani
2022	Dheere Dheere Badal Rahi Hai	"Title Song"	Rupankita Papari Sharma	Anand Mishra	Anand Mishra
2022	Ankhon Hi Ankhon Mein Baat Ho	"Title Song"	Deepika Satoshkar	Dilip Dutta	Deepak Sneh
2022	Main Deewana Sanam	"Main Deewana Sanam"	Solo	KK Junior	KK Junior
2022	Humnasheen - The Unspoken Love	"Humnasheen"	Solo	Arun Dehradooni	Arun Dehradooni
2022	Main Tumhara	"Main Tumhara Hua Ja Raha Hun"	Solo	Amitabh Ranjan	Amitabh Ranjan
2022	Diye Jale	"Title Song"	Rani Rangili	Baba Jagirdar	Rani Rangili
2022	Tera Hi Rehna Hai	"Title Song"	Sangeeta Shelke	Subhashish Bhattacharya	Shyam Raj
2022	Maine Khai Kasam Hai	"Title Song"	Kavita Krishnamurthy	Amrinder Singh	Amrinder Singh
2023	Tujhe Apna Bana Lu	"Title Song"	Kavi Sandhu	Nizam Pradeep	Nizam Sultanpuri
2023	Dil Bhi Rone Laga	"Title Song"	Solo	Sushant & Shankar	Kumaar
2023	Kahin Na Kahin	"Title Song"	Ami Surti	Satyajeet Roy	Ali Khan Roomani
2023	Music Room 2	"Dheere Dheere Se","Dil Hai Ke Manta Nahin","Tujhe Dekha To Yeh Jaana","Mera Dil Bhi"	Anuradha JuJu	Bappa B. Lahiri	Rani Malik, Faaiz Anwar,Jatin-Lalit
2023	Bane Mahaan	"Title Song"	Akash Burman	Rajib-Mona	Naqsh Lyallpuri
2023	Ban Jao Na Mere Humsafar	"Title Song"	Roshni Banerjee	Ashok Bardra	Rajiv Dutta
2023	Aashiqui Mein Had Se Guzarne De	"Title Song"	Sureli Roy	Sarbarish Mazumder	Syed Jilani
2023	O Meri Jaana	"Title Song"	Solo	Jugal Kishore	Jugal Kishore
2023	Deewangi	"Is Tarah Deewangi"	Sureli Roy	Sarbarish Mazumder	Syed Jilani
2023	Tera Khumar	"Chaya Hai Tera Khumar"	Aamir Shaikh	Aamir Ali	Sahil Fatehpuri
2023	Main Apke Seene Mein	"Title Song"	Solo	Nadeem Shravan	Sameer Anjaan
2023	Maahi Ve	"Title Song"	Solo	Nizam Pradeep	Pradeep Tiwari
2023	Kuch To Kehte	"Title Song"	Anweshaa	AARV	Niranjan Bhudhadhara
2023	Ishq Hai	"Title Song"	Solo	Raju Saha	Raju Saha
2023	Tera Naam	"Tera Naam Loon"	Sureli Roy & Solo	Sarbarish Mazumder	Sarbarish Mazumder
2023	Nashile Nain	"Tere Nashile Naino Ne"	Solo	Narender Sharma	Narender Sharma
2023	Tere Ishq Mein Itna Pagal	"Title Song"	Alka Yagnik	Gourav Dasgupta	Sameer Anjaan
2023	Tan Badan Te	"Title Song"	Asees Kaur	Chanchal Das	Harish Kataria
2023	Barish Ke Mahine Mein	"Title Song"	Solo	Gourav Dasgupta	Sameer Anjaan
2023	Saathiya	"Title Song"	Solo	Javed-Mohsin	Rashmi Virag
2023	Wo Aashiqui Samjhe Kahan	"Title Song"	Solo	Aryan Jaiin	Aryan Jaiin
2023	Mil Hi Gaye Hum Tum	"Title Song"	Anuradha Paudwal	Shruti Rane	Sameer Anjaan
2023	Dilruba	"O Meri Jaan E Jaan"	Jennifer	Tajul Islam	Ranit Ghosh
2023	Dil Ki Becheniya	"Title Song"	Solo	Pandit Vaibhav	Pandit Vaibhav
2023	Zindagi Phir Hamari	"Title Song"	Alka Yagnik	Munir Aziz Raza	Khurshid Hallauri
2023	Kaali Kaali Raaton Mein	"Title Song"	Solo	Aslam Keyi	Tanveer Ghazi
2023	Sau Dil	"Title Song"	Solo	Sarbarish Mazumder	Sarbarish & Syed Jilani
2023	Tu Aasman Tu Hi Zameen	"Title Song"	Solo	Remy Lachman	Relly Mahangi
2024	Ye Dil Teri Aashiqui Mein	"Title Song"	Solo	Chintu Mishra	Sonu
2024	Mitwa	"Mitwa"	Alka Yagnik	Umesh Mishra	Mukesh Sawan
2024	Pyar Jagaya Dilon Mein	"Title Song"	Sadhana Sargam	Vijay Raj	Raj Prakash Paul
2024	Hum Aur Tum	"Title Song"	Alka Bhatnagar	Nikhil Kamath	Vimal Kashyap
2024	Lovegiri	"Title Song"	Solo	Jugal Kishore	Jugal Kishore
2024	Meherbaani	"Title Song"	Solo	Sanjeev Chaturvedi	Sanjeev Chaturvedi
2024	Yaar Julahe	"Sakhi Ri"	Solo	Iqbal Darbar	Sahil Sultanpuri
2024	Kaanch Ka Dil	"Title Song"	Solo	Sanjeev Chaturvedi	Sanjeev Chaturvedi
2024	Bada Pachtaoge	"Title Song"	Solo	Sanjeev Chaturvedi	Sanjeev Chaturvedi
2024	Hum Hain Pahadi	"Title Song"	Dilip Sourmani	Rohit Modka	Hari Kishan Verma
2024	Mere Sanam	"Title Song"	Solo	Kaydee	Kaydee
2024	Is Liye Log	"Single Track"	Solo	Shabbir Ahmad	Shabbir Ahmad
2024	Momino Ki Shaan Hai	"Title Song"	Solo	Raja Ali	Sani Aslam
2024	Dil Mera Tod Ke	"Title Song"	Solo	Raja Ali	Sani Aslam
2024	Shiddat	"Title Song"	Rani Shakya	Nil Shakya	Nishila Shakya
2024	Chand Taare	"Title Song"	Solo	Raja Ali	Jamil Ahmed
2024	Kaise Jiyoon	"Title Song"	Solo	Aarv	Javed Anwar Khan
2024	Disco Yaatri	"Title Song","Zindagi Ka Ye Lamba Safar","Chhupa Chand Badal Mein","O Sajani","Mohabbat Hai Kya Chez","Yaadon Ka Aanchal", Tu Ae Gadi Le Chal Kahin"	Sadhana Sargam, Solo, Bhavna Pandit	Babu Kishan	Nandkumar Vichare
2024	Mera Dil Tera Hone Laga	"Title Song"	Aakanksha Sharma	Sanjeev Chaturvedi	Sanjeev Chaturvedi
2024	Ek Chhota Sa Gaon	"Title Song"	Solo	Kuldeep Shukla	Pramod Singh
2024	Tere Bin Lagena Dil	"Title Song"	Solo	Raja Ali	Ahmad Siddiqui
2024	Magical Moment Season 1	"Tujhe Dekha To" (Recreate)	Neha Karode	Abhijit Vaghani	Brighu Parashar
2024	Barishein Teri	"Title Song"	Madhushree	Robby Badal	Syed Jilani
2024	Sawan Ka Mahina	"Title Song"	Solo	Sanjeev Chaturvedi	Sanjeev Chaturvedi
2024	Tham Le Haath Mera	"Title Song"	Solo	Vijay Raj	Raj Prakash Paul
2024	Tera Hua Main	"Title Song"	Solo	Sarbarish Mazumder	Sarbarish Mazumder
2024	9 to 5	"Title Song"	Shannon K	Anabella Kumaar	Shannon K, Anabella Kumaar
2024	Rimjhim Hai Barish	"Title Song"	Solo	Aarv	Sachchidanand Shrivastav
2024	Salute	"Muskurahat Mein Teri"	Solo	Rajesh Ghayal	Dr. R Bhushan
2024	Chandni	"Title Song"	Kamal Chopra	Arvinder Raina	Shahab Allahabadi
2024	Aake Ruki	"Title Song"	Sadhana Sargam	Raja Ali	Ahmad Siddiqui, Rahima A Siddiqui
2024	Do Pal	"Title Song"	Solo	Shiladitya - Som	Sabir Khan
2024	Aankhon Mein Teri	"Title Song"	Solo	Raja Ali	Ahmad Siddiqui, Rahima A Siddiqui
2024	Agar Tum Nahi Milte	"Title Song"	Tripty Sinha	Sanjeev Chaturvedi	Sanjeev Chaturvedi
2024	Ba Khuda	"Title Song"	Anuradha Paudwal	Sanjeev Chaturvedi	Sanjeev Chaturvedi
2024	Mahi Ve	"Title Song"	Solo	Raja Ali	Ahmad Siddiqui, Rahima A. Siddiqui
2024	Tum Khaffa Ho Gaye	"Title Song"	Sandy Kaur	Raja Ali	Ahmad Siddiqui
2024	Hum Chura Lenge	"Title Song"	Solo	Bappi Lahiri	Indeevar
2024	Mujhe Har Pal Tera	"Title Song"	Solo	Raja Ali	Ahmad Siddiqui
2024	Pholon Ki Wadiyon Mein	"Title Song"	Alka Yagnik	Joshi Omik	Bhushan Kumar
2024	Bohot Haseen Ho Tum	"Title Song"	Alka Yagnik	Anand Raj Anand	Rani Malik
2024	Saanson Ke	"Title Song"	Shannon K	Raja Ali	Ahmed Siddiqui
2024	Pyaar Ho Gaya	"Title Song"	Swarnali Bose	Vishnu Narayan	Rishi Gautam
2024	Dil Mera Dukha Kar	"Title Song"	Solo	Sanjayraj Gaurinandan	Kausar Naaz
2025	Aisi Saza	"Title Song"	Solo	Raja Ali	Ahmed Siddiqui
2025	Rashmi	"Title Song"	Solo	Abhishek Toshniwal	Abhishek Toshniwal
2025	Sohbatein	"Title Song"	Akriti Kakkar	Akriti Kakkar	Geet Sagar
2025	Ek Tujhme Hi Basi Hai	"Title Song"	Solo	Raja Ali	Ahmed Siddiqui
2025	Tumhein Kaise Bhulaye	"Title Song"	Solo	Raja Ali	Raghib Irshad
2025	Aaj Meri Zindagi Mein	"Title Song"	Sunali Chaudhary	Sonali Chaudhary	Sonali Chaudhary
2025	O Sanam	"Title Song"	Solo	Kalicharan Roy	Kalicharan Roy
2025	Love You Papa	"Phool Jaise Mehke"	Roshni Banerjee	Ashok Bhadra	Panchi Jalonvi
2025	Tujhse Shuru	"Title Song"	Sandy	Raja Ali	Ahmed Siddiqui
2025	O Sanam	"Title Song"	Suparna Biswas	Shourya Ghatak	Abhishek Verma
2025	Sheher Mein	"Title Song"	Solo	Basu Bhattacharya	Satyajit Roy
2025	Baaton Mein Tum	"Title Song"	Solo	Kalicharan Roy	Kalicharan Roy
2025	Papa	"Title Song"	Shannon K	Raja Ali	Sameer Anjaan
2025	Haye Mera Dil	"Title Song"	Solo	Sanjeev Chaturvedi	Sanjeev Chaturvedi
2025	Dil Jaanta Hai	"Title Song"	Akriti Kakkar	Raja Ali	Raghib Irshad
2025	Aap Mere Khwaab Mein	"Title Song"	Solo	Sanjeev Chaturvedi	Sanjeev Chaturvedi
2025	Tu Hi To Hai	"Title Song"	Solo	Raja Ali	Raghib Irshad
2025	Harjaai	"Title Song"	Jatin Pandit	Jatin Pandit	Jatin Pandit
2025	Keh Na Sake	"Title Song"	Solo	Ritu Zeid	Manoj Kumar Nath
2025	Laut Ke Na Aa	"Title Song"	Solo	Aditya Dev	Geet Sagar
2025	Tum Par Hum Hain Atke 2.0	"Title Song"	Shannon K	Himesh Reshammiya	Sameer Anjaan
2025	Dosti	"Ye Dosti"	Udit Narayan, Abhijeet Bhattacharya, Vinod Rathod	Sarbarish Mazumder	Sarbarish Mazumder
2026	Dil To Choti Chez Hai	"Title Song"	Solo	Sanjeev Chaturvedi	Sanjeev Chaturvedi
2026	Pardesiya Pardes Mein	"Title Song"	Anuradha Paudwal	Raaj Sharma, Om Jha	Ravindra Gappi
2026	Honton Se Keh Do	"Title Song"	Solo	Raja Ali	Ratan Bapi Saha
2026	Ik Mehek	"Title Song"	Mahasweta Bose	Sanjayraj Gaurinandan	Kausar Naaz
2026	Jaan-e-Jahaan	"Title Song"	Solo	Basu Bhattacharya	Basu Bhattacharya
2026	Baaton Mein Teri	"Title Song"	Solo	Raja Ali	Raghib Irshad
2026	Raja Hindustani	"Maza Pyaar Karne Mein"	King	Mir Desai, King	King
2026	Har Zubaan Par Pancham	"Title Song"	Madhumita Chatterjee	Samir Chatterjee	Viresh Dutta
2026	Eid Mubarak Ho	"Title Song"	Solo	Raja Ali	Ahmed Siddiqui
2026	Dil Ki Batein	"Title Song"	Anuradha Paudal	Dev Tripathy	Dev Tripathy
2026	Jab Se Mili Tu	"Title Song"	Solo	Raja Ali	Ahmed Siddiqui
2026	Barso Ka Pyar	"Title Song"	Kavita Rajput	Rosario D'Souza	Taranf Bhagwat
2026	Koi Toh Mile Aisa Mujhe	"Title Song"	Pamela Jain	Sanjay Sharma	Shakir Ansari
2026	Mujhe Pyaar Ho Gaya	"Title Song"	Solo	Sarbarish Mazumder	Syed Jilani
2026	Nazar	"Nazar Mila Ke"	Solo	Raj Sen	Deepak Sneh
2026	Mere Yaar Shukriya	"Title Song"	Solo	Ritu Zeid	Tripurari
2026	Dil Mein Tum Bas Gaye	"Title Song"	Kavita Krishnamurthy	N.K Nandan	N.K Nandan
2026	Barsaat Na Zaya Karo	"Title Song"	Solo	Mohit Dogra	Mohit Dogra
2026	Mujhe Aap Mil Gaye	"Title Song"	Shannon K	Sanjeev Chaturvedi	Sanjeev Chaturvedi
2026	Lakire Ishq Ki Hongi	"Title Song"	Rachna Chopra	Shankar Bhattacharjee	Vinod Yadav
2026	Tu Lajawab	"Title Song"	Gul Saxena	Sanjeev Chaturvedi	Sanjeev Chaturvedi
2026	Aye Mere Watan	"Title Song"	Solo	Raja Ali	Ahmed Siddiqui
2026	Mera Dil Tere Pyar Mein	"Title Song"	Solo	Sanjeev Chaturvedi	Sanjeev Chaturvedi
2026	Mere Bina Tu Adhi Si	"Title Song"	Solo	Sanjeev Chaturvedi	Sanjeev Chaturvedi
2026	Humne Kasam Khayi Hai	"Title Song"	Solo	Sanjeev Chaturvedi	Sanjeev Chaturvedi
2026	Man I Love Favorite	"Chinta Nahin"	Frappe Ash	Akshay Rawat	Arvind Patel
2026	Phir Milenge	"Title Song"	Solo	Sarbarish	Sarbarish
2026	Yaar Khafa	"Title Song"	Raj Shekhar	Shabbir Ahmed	Shabbir Ahmed
2026	Tera Mera Yarana	"Title Song"	Udit Narayan	Sanjeev Chaturvedi	Sanjeev Chaturvedi
2026	Tumse Mile	"Title Song"	Solo	Panchanan Sarkar	Dr Deepak

== Hindi Television songs ==
Year	TV Series	Song name(s)	Music director(s)	Lyricist	Co-singer(s)
1989	Kaash	"Tum Dil Churate Ho			solo
1989	Kaash	"Tum Yaad Aate Ho"			solo
1989	Kaash	"Kitne Tanha The Hum"			Kavita Krishnamurty
1989	Umang Tarang	"Lakh Samhala Dil Nahi Mana"	Arup-Pranay		solo
1989	Umang Tarang	"Mila Koi Dagar Mein"	Arup-Pranay		solo
1989	Zimbo	"Zimbo Shehar Mein Phirse Aaya"	Bappi Lahiri		solo
1992	Yeh Duniya Ghazab Ki	"Yeh Duniya Ghazab Ki"			Udit Narayan
1993	Armaan	"Jaane Kahan Tu Hai"	Himesh Reshammiya		solo
1993	Armaan	"Sharmaana Aise Banno"	Himesh Reshammiya		solo
1994	Junoon	"Mohabbat Ki Adaon Se"			Kavita Krishnamurthy
1994	Kismat	"Tumhe Dil Kahoon Sanam"	Dilip Sen-Sameer Sen		Kavita Krishnamurthy
1994	Kismat	"Kismat Ka To"	Dilip Sen-Sameer Sen		solo
1995	Raaz....Ki Ek Baat....	"Raaz Hai"	Lalit Sen		solo
1995	Saahil	"Saahil Chup Chup Rehti Hai"			solo
1996	Amar Prem	"Ye Amar Prem"	Himesh Reshammiya	Sudhakar Sharma	Solo
1998	Detective Karan	"Detective Karan" (title song)	Sanjeev Kohli		solo
1998	Jaan	"Dil Hai Nadaan"	Himesh Reshammiya	Sudhakar Sharma	Sudesh Berry
1998	Ahaa	"Bole Dil Ahaa"	Himesh Reshammiya	Sudhakar Sharma	Solo
1998	Anurag	"Dil Ka Ye Anurag Hai"	Himesh Reshammiya	Sudhakar Sharma	Solo
2004	Kehta Hai Dil	"Title Song"	Lalit Sen	Naqsh Layalpuri	Alka Yagnik
2012	Ek Tukda Chaand Ka	"Title Song"	Nida Fazli		Solo
2016	Naamkaran	"Dhoop Ka Ek Tukda Hoon Main"	Anu Malik		Anuradha Paudwal
2017	Yeh Un Dinon Ki Baat Hai	"Yeh Un Dinon Ki Baat Hai" (title song)	Anu Malik		Sadhana Sargam

== Bengali film songs ==
Year	Film	Song name(s)	Music director(s)	Co-singer(s)
1998	Ami Sei Meye	Aguner Din Shesh hobe Ekdin"		
Tabun Sutradhar
Kavita Krishnamurthy
2002	Deva	Ki Kore Je Prem Hoe"	Bappi Lahiri	Sadhana Sargam
2002	Deva	Bhabini Kakhono Je Ami	Bappi Lahiri	Sadhana Sargam
2002	Deva	Beauty Queen"	Bappi Lahiri	

== Bengali non-film songs ==
Year	Album(s)	Song name(s)	Co-singer(s)	Music director(s)	Lyricist
1987	Sujon Kanai	"Sara Jonom Dhoira"	solo	Bhushan Kumar	N/A
1987	Sujon Kanai	"Bombay Bombay"	solo	Bhushan Kumar	N/A
1987	Sujon Kanai	"Kishore Kumar"	solo	Bhushan Kumar	N/A
1987	Sujon Kanai	"Moharani Seje"	solo	Bhushan Kumar	N/A
1991	Priyotama Mone Rekho	"Priyotama Mone Rekho"	solo	Arup Pranay	Pulak Banerjee
1991	Priyotama Mone Rekho	"Tomar Hasite Bodhu"	solo	Arup Pranay	Pulak Banerjee
1991	Priyotama Mone Rekho	"O Chokhe Amar"	solo	Arup Pranay	Pulak Banerjee
1991	Priyotama Mone Rekho	"Eto Noi Noi"	solo	Arup Pranay	Pulak Banerjee
1991	Priyotama Mone Rekho	"Aar Katokal Ami Saibo"	solo	Arup Pranay	Pulak Banerjee
1991	Priyotama Mone Rekho	"Tomra Asbe To"	solo	Arup Pranay	Gautam Saha
1991	Priyotama Mone Rekho	"Ghumao O Chand"	solo	Arup Pranay	Pulak Banerjee
1991	Priyotama Mone Rekho	"Eto Noy Shudhu Gaan"	solo	Satinath Mukhopadhyay	Gauriprasanna Mazumder
1991	Priyotama Mone Rekho	"Tumi Ki Ekhon Dekhichho Swapon"	solo	Kamal Dasgupta	Pranab Roy
1991	Priyotama Mone Rekho	"Tomar Patha Pane Chahi"	solo	Sailen Roy	Himashu Dutta
1991	Priyotama Mone Rekho	"Duti Pakhi Duti Teere"	solo	Girin Chakrabarty	Kamal Dasgupta
1991	Priyotama Mone Rekho	"Eto Sur Aar Eto Gaan"	solo	Sudhin Dasgupta	Sudhin Dasgupta
1991	Surer Rajanigandha	"Jibone Amar Aro Aachee Gaan"	solo	Arup Pranay	Pulak Banerjee
1991	Surer Rajanigandha	"Tumi Janona Naki Bojhona"	solo	Arup Pranay	Pulak Banerjee
1991	Surer Rajanigandha	"Tumi Achho Eto Kachhe Tai"	solo	Arup Pranay	Pulak Banerjee
1991	Surer Rajanigandha	"Tumi Elena Keno Elena"	solo	Arup Pranay	Pulak Banerjee
1991	Surer Rajanigandha	"Tomar Sure Sur Bendhechhi"	solo	Arup Pranay	Pulak Banerjee
1991	Surer Rajanigandha	"Phuler Chhnoa Jadi Lage"	solo	Arup Pranay	Pulak Banerjee
1991	Surer Rajanigandha	"Kato Dur Chale Elam"	solo	Arup Pranay	Pulak Banerjee
1991	Surer Rajanigandha	"Keno Tumi Amake Je Eto Bhalobaso"	solo	Arup Pranay	Pulak Banerjee
1991	Surer Rajanigandha	"Aaj Jhar Je Hoyechhe Bandhu"	solo	Arup Pranay	Bishwapriyo Banerjee
1991	Surer Rajanigandha	" Ei Sundar Mukhu"	solo	Arup Pranay	Pulak Banerjee
1991	Surer Rajanigandha	"Or Duti Chokh"	solo	Arup Pranay	Prodip Maaji
1991	Surer Rajanigandha	"Dure Chole Gele"	solo	Ajoy Das	Pulak Banerjee
1993	Best Of Kumar Sanu, Volume 2	"Jakhan Ratri Nijhum"	solo	various	various
1993	Best Of Kumar Sanu, Volume 2	"Khao Dao Bancho Nacho"	solo	various	various
1993	Best Of Kumar Sanu, Volume 2	"Darza Khulya Dekhum Jare" (male)	solo	various	various
1993	Best Of Kumar Sanu, Volume 2	"Ganer Khatay Patay Patay"	solo	various	various
1993	Best Of Kumar Sanu, Volume 2	"Prem Korechi Besh"	Sadhana Sargam	various	various
1993	Best Of Kumar Sanu, Volume 2	"Dukkher Din Aaj Kannar"	Sadhana Sargam	various	various
1993	Best Of Kumar Sanu, Volume 2	"Tumi Ami Dujane"	Sadhana Sargam	various	various
1993	Best Of Kumar Sanu, Volume 2	"O Rupa Tomar Khas"	Sadhana Sargam	various	various
1993	Best Of Kumar Sanu, Volume 2	"Onek Tarar Majhe Je Tui"	Anupama Deshpande, Amit Kumar	various	various
1993	Sonar Meye	"Tomai Ki Konodin Bolechi"	solo	Arup Banerjee, Pranay	
1993	Sonar Meye	"Koto Sohojei Je Por"	solo	Arup Banerjee, Pranay	
1993	Sonar Meye	"Ei Gotur Gaari Chepe Ekdin"	solo	Arup Banerjee, Pranay	
1993	Sonar Meye	"Bhorer Hawai Pathiye Dilam"	solo	Arup Banerjee, Pranay	
1993	Sonar Meye	"Du Gaale Tol Khawano"	solo	Arup Banerjee, Pranay	
1993	Sonar Meye	"Joto Duure Thako Tumi"	solo	Arup Banerjee, Pranay	
1993	Sonar Meye	"Rojonigondha Raate"	solo	Arup Banerjee, Pranay	
1993	Sonar Meye	"Deewana Tumi Bolo Aamake"	solo	Arup Banerjee, Pranay	
1993	Dhitang Dhitang Bole - Nacher Gaan	"Sohag Chand Badani Dhani"	solo		
1994	Sakali Tomari Ichchha	"Sakali Tomari Ichchha"			
1994	Sakali Tomari Ichchha	"Amar Sadh Na Mitilo"			
1994	Sakali Tomari Ichchha	"Basan Paro Ma Basan Paro"			
1994	Sakali Tomari Ichchha	"Mayer Paye Jaba Hoye"			
1994	Sakali Tomari Ichchha	"Shadanandya"			
1994	Sakali Tomari Ichchha	"Chokher Jale Dhoya"			
1994	Sakali Tomari Ichchha	"Shyama Ma Ki Amar Kalo"			
1994	Sakali Tomari Ichchha	"Tui Naki Ma Dayamoyee"			
1995	Bondhu Amar Naamta	"Sob Kichhu Bhanga Ghore"	solo	B Shubhayu	Pulak Banerjee, Ratan Saha, Sameer Ghosh
1995	Bondhu Amar Naamta	"Tomar Chokhe"	solo	B Shubhayu	Pulak Banerjee, Ratan Saha, Sameer Ghosh
1995	Bondhu Amar Naamta	"Jai Bolo Jai"	solo	B Shubhayu	Pulak Banerjee, Ratan Saha, Sameer Ghosh
1995	Bondhu Amar Naamta	"Jajabar Bhabaghure"	solo	B Shubhayu	Pulak Banerjee, Ratan Saha, Sameer Ghosh
1995	Bondhu Amar Naamta	"Koto Holo Chena Jana"	solo	B Shubhayu	Pulak Banerjee, Ratan Saha, Sameer Ghosh
1995	Bondhu Amar Naamta	"Bondhu Amar Neam Ta"	solo	B Shubhayu	Pulak Banerjee, Ratan Saha, Sameer Ghosh
1995	Bondhu Amar Naamta	"Bhalobasa Jodi"	solo	B Shubhayu	Pulak Banerjee, Ratan Saha, Sameer Ghosh
1995	Bondhu Amar Naamta	"Ami To Emon"	solo	B Shubhayu	Pulak Banerjee, Ratan Saha, Sameer Ghosh
1995	Gaan	"Swaralopi Ami Aar Khujina"	solo	Tapan Bhattacharya	Bibhas Goswami
1995	Gaan	"Neel Neel Akashe"	solo	Tapan Bhattacharya	Bibhas Goswami
1995	Gaan	"aajo Jeno Mone Hoy"	solo	Tapan Bhattacharya	Bibhas Goswami
1995	Gaan	"Dilam Tomay Jonmodine"	solo	Tapan Bhattacharya	Bibhas Goswami
1995	Gaan	"Hawa O Hawa"	solo	Tapan Bhattacharya	Bibhas Goswami
1995	Hits Of Kumar Sanu	"Bhalobashi Ami Bolte Parini"			
1995	Hits Of Kumar Sanu	"Sob Raate Purnima Hoi Na"			
1995	Hits Of Kumar Sanu	"Jhalmal Jhalmal Tanter Shari"			
1995	Hits Of Kumar Sanu	"E Bangla Bale Amay"			
1995	Hits Of Kumar Sanu	"Mone Pore Choitali Godhulibela"			
1995	Hits Of Kumar Sanu	"Or Duti Chokha"			
1995	Kumar Sanu - Ek Kanyake Dekhe	"Tomar Chokher Tara"			
1995	Jalsaghar	"E Gaane Chirodin"	solo	various	various
1995	Jalsaghar	"Achena Akash Dur"	solo	various	various
1995	Jalsaghar	"Aj Onek Diner Pore"	solo	various	various
1995	Jalsaghar	"Ekti Poloke Ekti Jhalake"	solo	various	various
1995	Jalsaghar	"Jani Ar Tomar Sathe"	solo	various	various
1995	Jalsaghar	"Jiboner Ai Jalsaghar"	solo	various	various
1995	Jalsaghar	"Jeo Janena Mon Je Amar"	solo	various	various
1995	Jalsaghar	"Sei Godhuli Bela"	solo	various	various
1995	Jalsaghar	"Tomar Choke Bhorer"	solo	various	various
1995	Jalsaghar	N/A	solo	various	various
1995	Moner Manush	"Amito Emon"	solo	various	various
1995	Moner Manush	"Bandhu Amar Naamta"	solo	various	various
1995	Moner Manush	"Bhalobasha Jodi"	solo	various	various
1995	Moner Manush	"Bole Jai Bole Jai"	solo	various	various
1995	Sei Dekha Holo	"Jajabor Bhoboghure"	solo	various	various
1995	Sei Dekha Holo	"Koto Holo Chena Jana"	solo	various	various
1995	Sei Dekha Holo	"Sob Kichu Bhange Gore"	solo	various	various
1995	Sei Dekha Holo	"Amar E Jibane Ese Tumi	solo	various	various
1995	Sei Dekha Holo	"E To Shesh Dekha Noy"	solo	various	various
1995	Sei Dekha Holo	"Ami Tomay Na Dekhe"	solo	various	various
1995	Sei Dekha Holo	"Aaj Tare Keno Mone Pore"	solo	various	various
1995	Sei Dekha Holo	"Phaguner Unmadonay"	solo	various	various
1997	Gaane Bhubon Bhoriye Debo	"Ek Je Kishore Chilo"	solo	Tapan Bhattacharya	various
1997	Gaane Bhubon Bhoriye Debo	"Shudhui Bhebei Sara Holam"	solo	Tapan Bhattacharya	various
1997	Gaane Bhubon Bhoriye Debo	"Sonena Aamar Kotha"	solo	Tapan Bhattacharya	various
1997	Gaane Bhubon Bhoriye Debo	"Saralipi Aami Aar"	solo	Tapan Bhattacharya	various
1997	Gaane Bhubon Bhoriye Debo	"Kaliyan Chaman Khushbo Pawan"	solo	Tapan Bhattacharya	various
1997	Gaane Bhubon Bhoriye Debo	"Megh Chuyen Chuyen Jaai"	solo	Tapan Bhattacharya	various
1997	Gaane Bhubon Bhoriye Debo	"Good Bye Ogo Bhalobasa"	solo	Tapan Bhattacharya	various
1997	Gaane Bhubon Bhoriye Debo	"Gaane Bhuban Bhariye Debo"	solo	Tapan Bhattacharya	various
1997	Gaane Bhubon Bhoriye Debo	"Boli O Shoshurer Jhi"	solo	Tapan Bhattacharya	various
1997	Gaane Bhubon Bhoriye Debo	"Pyar Mein Jaanemaan"	Alka Yagnik	Tapan Bhattacharya	various
1997	Ogo Ruposhi	"Seto Naam Dhore Daakeni"	Bhushan Kumar	solo	
1997	Ogo Ruposhi	"Are Bajare Baja"	Bhushan Kumar	solo	
1999	Sobar Priyo Gaan	"Chander Eto Gaan"	solo	various	various
1999	Sobar Priyo Gaan	"Tumi Ki Ekhon Dekhichho"	solo	various	various
1999	Sobar Priyo Gaan	"Tomar Patho Pane Chahi"	solo	various	various
1999	Sobar Priyo Gaan	"Eto Sur Aar Eto Gaan"	solo	various	various
1999	Sobar Priyo Gaan	"Eto Noy Shudhu Gaan"	solo	various	various
1999	Sobar Priyo Gaan	"Emon Din Aste Pare"	solo	various	various
1999	Sobar Priyo Gaan	"Duti Pakhi Duti Tire"	solo	various	various
2000	Eid Eseche	"Aayre Duhat Bhore"	solo	N/A	N/A
2000	Eid Eseche	"Tyager Arek Naam"	solo	N/A	N/A
2000	Eid Eseche	"Sresto Tumi He"	solo	N/A	N/A
2000	Eid Eseche	"Oi Pakhiter Gaane"	solo	N/A	N/A
2000	Eid Eseche	"Asmane Uthlo Je"	solo	N/A	N/A
2000	Eid Eseche	"Ferari Mukh Tumi"	solo	N/A	N/A
2000	Eid Eseche	"Aye Malik Tumi Je"	solo	N/A	N/A
2000	Eid Eseche	"Ayere Duhat Bhore"	solo	N/A	N/A
2000	Eid Eseche	"Eid Eseche Bhai"	solo	N/A	N/A
2000	Mominer Ibadat	Tomar Namer"	solo	N/A	N/A
2000	Mominer Ibadat	"Aai Re Chute Sab Aai Re"	solo	N/A	N/A
2000	Mominer Ibadat	"E Jagate Sab"	solo	N/A	N/A
2000	Mominer Ibadat	"Islamer Artho Shanti"	solo	N/A	N/A
2000	Mominer Ibadat	"Khodar Rahmat Niye"	solo	N/A	N/A
2000	Mominer Ibadat	"Ki Kore Dur Habe"	solo	N/A	N/A
2000	Mominer Ibadat	"Mubarak Eid"	solo	N/A	N/A
2000	Mominer Ibadat	"Shono Momin"	solo	N/A	N/A
2000	Mominer Ibadat	"Tomar Mazare"	solo	N/A	N/A
2000	O Kanai Paar Kore De	"O Kanai Paar Kore De"	solo	Chandrakanta Nandy	Paritosh Roy
2000	O Kanai Paar Kore De	"Amay Bhashaili Re"	solo	Chandrakanta Nandy	Paritosh Roy
2000	O Kanai Paar Kore De	"Bhalo Koira Bajao"	solo	Chandrakanta Nandy	Paritosh Roy
2000	O Kanai Paar Kore De	"O Amar Dorodi Age Janle"	solo	Chandrakanta Nandy	Paritosh Roy
2000	O Kanai Paar Kore De	"Ichchha Kare Parandahre"	solo	Chandrakanta Nandy	Paritosh Roy
2000	O Kanai Paar Kore De	"Guru Na Bhoji Muin"	solo	Chandrakanta Nandy	Paritosh Roy
2000	O Kanai Paar Kore De	"Prabhat Samay Kaale"	solo	Chandrakanta Nandy	Paritosh Roy
2000	O Kanai Paar Kore De	"Sohag Chand Bodoni Dhoni"	solo	Chandrakanta Nandy	Paritosh Roy
2002	Phote Je Rokto Golap	"Bohu Dur Theke"	solo	various	various
2002	Phote Je Rokto Golap	"Phote Je Rokto Golap"	solo	various	various
2002	Phote Je Rokto Golap	"Nai Nai E Andhar"	solo	various	various
2002	Phote Je Rokto Golap	"Eto Kanna Eto Noy Gaan"	solo	various	various
2002	Phote Je Rokto Golap	"Aamar Naam Anthony"	solo	various	various
2002	Phote Je Rokto Golap	"E Aamar Guru "	solo	various	various
2002	Phote Je Rokto Golap	"Kaththak"	solo	various	various
2002	Phote Je Rokto Golap	"Ki Upahar"	solo	various	various
2002	Phote Je Rokto Golap	"Parina Saite Na Pari Koyte"	solo	various	various
2002	Phote Je Rokto Golap	"E Aamar Sesh Gaan (Tiger)"	solo	various	various
2003	Priyatama Mone Rekho	"Ghumao O Chand"	solo		
2003	Priyatama Mone Rekho	"Ke Bale Thakuma"	solo		
2003	Priyatama Mone Rekho	"Tumi Ki Ekhon Dekhichho Swapon"	solo		
2003	Priyatama Mone Rekho	"Duti Pakhi Duti Teere 1999"	solo		
2003	Smriti Je Kande	"Bhalobasha More"	solo	Arup Pranay	Pulak Banerjee
2003	Smriti Je Kande	"Aadho Raate"	solo	Arup Pranay	Pulak Banerjee
2003	Smriti Je Kande	"Jibone Jare Tumi"	solo	Arup Pranay	Pulak Banerjee
2003	Smriti Je Kande	"Jibone Jodi Deep"	solo	Arup Pranay	Pulak Banerjee
2003	Smriti Je Kande	"Mon Dilo Na Bandhu"	solo	Arup Pranay	Pulak Banerjee
2003	Smriti Je Kande	"Mor Priya Hobe Eso Rani"	solo	Arup Pranay	
2003	Smriti Je Kande	"Srimati Je Kande"	solo	Arup Pranay	
2003	Prerona	"Aaj Ei Sonali Sondhai	solo	Arup-Pranay	
2003	Prerona	"Ei Mon Kothai Harate Chai"	solo	Arup-Pranay	
2003	Prerona	"Ei Pata Jhore"	solo	Arup-Pranay	
2003	Prerona	"Ese Gechi Sei Gaane"	solo	Arup-Pranay	
2003	Prerona	"Jake Moner Kothao Tumi"	solo	Arup-Pranay	
2003	Prerona	"Khola Janalai"	solo	Arup-Pranay	
2003	Prerona	"Mayabi Raat Amar Dake"	solo	Arup-Pranay	
2003	Prerona	"Nijeke Lage Ochena"	solo	Arup-Pranay	
2003	Prerona	"Onek Bochor Pore"	solo	Arup-Pranay	
2003	Prerona	"Sisir Dhoa Golap Gulo"	solo	Arup-Pranay	
2006	Moner Moina	"Raag Korechhe"	solo		
2006	Moner Moina	"A Sonar Banglay"	solo		
2006	Moner Moina	"Raag Korechhe"	solo		
2006	Moner Moina	"Jhiri Jhiri Hawa"	solo		
2006	Moner Moina	"Chokher Taray"	solo		
2006	Moner Moina	"Naa Amo Apon"	solo		
2006	Moner Moina	"Mon Karabi"	solo		
2006	Moner Moina	"Aie Shahore"	solo		
2008	Chhil Achhi Thakbo	"Cahridike Ronger Bahar"	solo	Sayed Ahmed	Chiranjit Bose
2008	Chhil Achhi Thakbo	"Eka Eka Cholo Na"	solo	Sayed Ahmed	Chiranjit Bose
2008	Chhil Achhi Thakbo	"Ekti Pakhi Kolorobe"	solo	Sayed Ahmed	Chiranjit Bose
2008	Chhil Achhi Thakbo	"Elo Melo"	solo	Sayed Ahmed	Chiranjit Bose
2008	Chhil Achhi Thakbo	"Jani Na Mon Ki Je "	solo	Sayed Ahmed	Chiranjit Bose
2008	Chhil Achhi Thakbo	"Jodi Megher Saathe Jete Jete"	solo	Sayed Ahmed	Chiranjit Bose
2008	Chhil Achhi Thakbo	"Kotha Dao Tumi Asbe Abar"	solo	Sayed Ahmed	Chiranjit Bose
2008	Chhil Achhi Thakbo	"Mepe Mepe Kotha Bolo"	solo	Sayed Ahmed	Chiranjit Bose
2009	De Maa Pagol Kore (Shyama Sangeet)	"Amay Ektu Jayga Dao"	solo	Mrinal Banerjee	Pulak Banerjee
2009	De Maa Pagol Kore (Shyama Sangeet)	"Jenechi Jenechi Tara"	solo	Robbin Ganguli	Sochi Dulal Chakraupadhya
2012	Amar Kolkata	"Pujo Elo Pujo Elo"	solo	Arup-Pranay	
2012	Amar Kolkata	"Du Chok Phute Prothom Dekha"	solo	Arup-Pranay	
2012	Amar Kolkata	"Khushi Te Mon"	solo	Arup-Pranay	
2012	Amar Kolkata	"Kichu Swapno Aaro"	solo	Arup-Pranay	
2012	Ke Tomaye Korechego Shundar	"Ke Tomaye Korechego Shundar"	solo		
2013	Amar Kolkata	"Pujo Elo"	solo	A. Pranay	Utpal Das
2013	Anupama	"Jibon Mane Ki"	solo	Bijoy Kashyap	Bijoy Kashyap
2013	Chirosathi	"Ami Je Boro Eka"	N/A	N/A	solo
2013	Jodi Phire Asi	"Jodi Phire Asi"	Kundan Saha		Aishwarya
2013	Jodi Phire Asi	"Tomay Shudhu Tomay"	Kundan Saha		Aishwarya
2013	Jodi Phire Asi	"Eka Ekla Mon"	Kundan Saha		solo
2013	Jodi Phire Asi	"Hoyto Mukher Adol"	Kundan Saha		solo
2013	O Shreya	"O Shreya"	Anup Rana		solo
2013	O Shreya	"Golap Ful Tulte Gele"	Anup Rana		solo
2013	O Shreya	"Dike Dike Charidike"	Anup Rana		solo
2014	Bhanga Mon	"Mone Koro Prithibite"	solo	Ayub Bachchu	
2014	Tumi Pashe Nei	"Shojoni Ami To Tomar"	solo	Pranab Ghosh	
2015	Dushtu Chokhe Mishti Hashi	"Shubhologne Holo"	solo	Babul Bose	Moushumi
2015	Dushtu Chokhe Mishti Hashi	"Dushtu Chokhe Mishti Hashi"	solo	Babul Bose	Moushumi
2015	Swapne Sajai	"Aaj Ami Sei Chokhe"	solo	Moushumi	Sitangshu Majumder
2015	Swapne Sajai	"Kichu Kotha Aaj Rekhe Jai"	solo	Moushumi	Sitangshu Majumder
2017	Jhiri Jhiri Sei Brishti	"Jhiri Jhiri Sei Brishti"	solo	Raju Saha	
2017	Jhiri Jhiri Sei Brishti	"Bhaloto Basini Tare"	solo	Raju Saha	
2017	Jhiri Jhiri Sei Brishti	"Eki Gaan Sonale"	solo	Raju Saha	
2017	Jhiri Jhiri Sei Brishti	"Ganga Tumi Boicho Jeno"	solo	Raju Saha	
2017	Jhiri Jhiri Sei Brishti	"Jodi Sopno Dekhte Chai"	solo	Raju Saha	
2017	Jhiri Jhiri Sei Brishti	"Khola Janala Diye"	solo	Raju Saha	
2017	Jhiri Jhiri Sei Brishti	Ramdhonu Lukiye"	solo	Raju Saha	
2017	Jhiri Jhiri Sei Brishti	"Tui Je Amar Jibon"	solo	Raju Saha	
2018	Bhalobasa Joto Boro	"Bhalobasa Joto Boro"	Mitali Mukherjee	Alauddin Ali	Mohammad Rafiquzzaman
2018	Amake Dukkho Diye	"Amake Dukkho Diye"	Solo	Alauddin Ali	Moniruzzaman Monir
2018	Sonali Sharode (Agomoni Gaan)	"Sonali Sharode (Agomoni Gaan)"	Solo	Shelley Chakraborty	Shelley Chakraborty
2018	Sojoni	"Sojoni"	Solo	Pronob Ghosh	Ahmed Risvy
2018	Hits Of Kumar Sanu	"Tomra Asbe To"	Solo	Arup-Pranay	Gautam Saha
2018	Jhiri Jhiri Bristi	"Ganga Tumi Boicho Jeno"	Solo	Raju Saha	Raju Saha
2018	Mone Koro Prithibite	"Mone Koro Prithibite	Solo	Pronob Ghosh	Shagor Al Helal
2018	Ultimate Bengali Hits of Kumar Sanu & Alka Yagnik Evergreen Collection	"Payaliya"	Babul Bose	Gautam Sushmit	Sasha Ghoshal
2018	Ultimate Bengali Hits of Kumar Sanu & Alka Yagnik Evergreen Collection	"Sato Janam Dhore"	Babul Bose	Gautam Sushmit	Sasha Ghoshal
2018	Ultimate Bengali Hits of Kumar Sanu & Alka Yagnik Evergreen Collection	"Onu Kaaro Naa Shathi"	Babul Bose	Gautam Sushmit	Sasha Ghoshal
2018	Ultimate Bengali Hits of Kumar Sanu & Alka Yagnik Evergreen Collection	"Priya Tumi"	Babul Bose	Gautam Sushmit	Sasha Ghoshal
2018	Ultimate Bengali Hits of Kumar Sanu & Alka Yagnik Evergreen Collection	"Sei Falgun To Ello"	Babul Bose	Gautam Sushmit	Sasha Ghoshal
2018	Ultimate Bengali Hits of Kumar Sanu & Alka Yagnik Evergreen Collection	"Aamar Monta Aeto Pagal"	Babul Bose	Gautam Sushmit	Sasha Ghoshal
2018	Ultimate Bengali Hits of Kumar Sanu & Alka Yagnik Evergreen Collection	"Chupi Chupi Isharay"	Babul Bose	Gautam Sushmit	Sasha Ghoshal
2018	Ultimate Bengali Hits of Kumar Sanu & Alka Yagnik Evergreen Collection	"Shobari Kopale Shukh Shoina"	Babul Bose	Gautam Sushmit	solo
2018	Ultimate Bengali Hits of Kumar Sanu & Alka Yagnik Evergreen Collection	"Nithor Joler Buk Chhuye (Male)"	Babul Bose	Gautam Sushmit	solo
2018	Ultimate Bengali Hits of Kumar Sanu & Alka Yagnik Evergreen Collection	"Jano Na Tumi"	Babul Bose	Gautam Sushmit	solo
2018	Ultimate Bengali Hits of Kumar Sanu & Alka Yagnik Evergreen Collection	"Tumi Aamar Priyotoma (Solo)"	Babul Bose	Gautam Sushmit	solo
2018	Ultimate Bengali Hits of Kumar Sanu & Alka Yagnik Evergreen Collection	"Tomar Daradiya Mon"	Babul Bose	Gautam Sushmit	solo
2018	Ultimate Bengali Hits of Kumar Sanu & Alka Yagnik Evergreen Collection	"Pagal E Mon Khon Je"	Babul Bose	Gautam Sushmit	chorus
2019	Chokher Aral	"Chokher Aral"	Md. Robin Islam	Kazi Shahin	Mili Parvez
2019	Deep Nebhano Raat	"Aaj Ei Deen Take"	solo		
2019	Deep Nebhano Raat	"Amar Deep Nebhano Raat"	solo		
2019	Deep Nebhano Raat	"Amar Moner Ei Mayur Mohole"	solo		
2019	Deep Nebhano Raat	"Ek Poloker Ektu Dekha"	solo		
2019	Deep Nebhano Raat	"Ki Ashai Badhi Khelaghar"	solo		
2019	Deep Nebhano Raat	Manush Jonmo Diye Bidhi"	solo		
2019	Deep Nebhano Raat	"Neel Neel Akashay"	solo		
2019	Deep Nebhano Raat	"Seto Elo Na"	solo		
2020	Single	"Amra Korbo Joy"	Aneek Dhar, Anweshaa, Raghav Chatterjee, Debashree Roy, Keka Ghoshal, Usha Uthup, Debojit Saha, Raj Barmon, Nachiketa Chakraborty	Joy-Anjan	Traditional
2020	Noakhailla Maiya	"Noakhailla Maiya"	Rajan Saha	Dr. Rajub Bhowmik	solo
2020	Aaj Phir	"Aaj Phir"	solo		
2022	Single	"Ek Poloke Tomay Dekhe"	solo	Ashok Bhadra	Deba Prasad Chakraborty
N/A	Amar Ei Poth	"Aaj Jyotsna Raate"	solo		
N/A	Amar Ei Poth	"Aaj Sobar Range Rang Mesate"	solo		
N/A	Amar Ei Poth	"Aguner Parashmoni"	solo		
N/A	Amar Ei Poth	"Amar Ea Path"	solo		
N/A	Amar Ei Poth	"Amar Kantho Hote"	solo		
N/A	Amar Ei Poth	"Amar Moner Koner Bayre"	solo		
N/A	Amar Ei Poth	"Amar Naiba Holo Pare Jaowa"	solo		
N/A	Amar Ei Poth	"Ashru Nadir Sudur Pare"	solo		
N/A	Amar Ei Poth	"Dariye Achho Tumi"	solo		
N/A	Amar Ei Poth	"Daya Diye Hobe Go"	solo		
N/A	Amar Ei Poth	"Je Raate Mor Duar Guli"	solo		
N/A	Amar Ei Poth	"Ore Bhai Phagun Legechhe Bone"	solo		
N/A	Chokhe Legeche Nesha	"Ektu Ektu Kore"	Alka Yagnik	various	various
N/A	Chokhe Legeche Nesha	"Chokhe Chokhe Rakhi"	Alka Yagnik	various	various
N/A	Chokhe Legeche Nesha	"Thakena Ei Mon"	Alka Yagnik	various	various
N/A	Chokhe Legeche Nesha	"Ke Tumi Ogo Bolona"	Alka Yagnik	various	various
N/A	Chokhe Legeche Nesha	"Amake Chinle Na"	Alka Yagnik	various	various
N/A	Chokhe Legeche Nesha	"Chaina To Beshi Kichu"	Alka Yagnik	various	various
N/A	Chokhe Legeche Nesha	"Chokh Bole Mon Bole"	Alka Yagnik	various	various

== Telugu film Songs ==
Year	Film	Song name(s)	Music director(s)	Co-singer(s)
1991	Saajan	"Ela Brathakanu"	Nadeem–Shravan	TK Kala
1991	Saajan	"Naa Manasu Maate"	Nadeem–Shravan	TK Kala
1994	Prapancham	"Kanan Kothi Ponnesso"	Peter Cheanallor	solo
2000	Jayam Manadera	"Meriseti Jabili Nuvve"	Vandemataram Srinivas	Swarnalatha
2001	Tholi Valapu	"Vandanam Vandanam"	Vandemataram Srinivas	Kavita Krishnamurthy
2001	Badrachalam	"Oh O Cheliya"	Vandemataram Srinivas	Swarnalatha
2001	Adipathi	"Abbabba Tuntari Gaali"	Koti	K. S. Chithra
2001	Nuvvu Naaku Nachav	"Okkasari Cheppaleva"	Koti	K. S. Chithra
2001	Itlu Sravani Subramanyam	"Pillo Pisinari Pillo"	Chakri	Kousalya
2001	6 Teens	"Devudu Varamadisthe"	Ghantadi Krishna	Solo
2001	Idhe Naa Modhati Premalekha	"Premincha"	Ghantadi Krishna	
2002	Premaku Swagatam	"Vendi Vennello"	S. V. Krishna Reddy	Usha
2002	Lahiri Lahiri Lahirilo	"Mantramedo Vesindi"	M. M. Keeravani	K. S. Chithra
2002	Yuvaratna	"Sakhiya"	M. M. Keeravani	Sadhana Sargam
2002	Koduku	"Mila Mila Merise"	Vandemataram Srinivas	Sadhana Sargam
2002	Jenda	"Kushalama O Nesthama"	Vandemataram Srinivas	Usha
2002	Girl Friend	"Nuvvu Naaku Nachave"	Vandemataram Srinivas	
2002	Kalalu Kandham Raa	"Ekkadekkado"	Ramesh Erra	Usha
2002	Mandharam	"Choosthune"	Ghantadi Krishna	
2002	Layola College	"O Cheliya"	Ghantadi Krishna	
2002	Chance	"Nannu Choodani"	Ghantadi Krishna	
2002	Vignesh	"Telisindi Naaku"	Ghantadi Krishna	
2003	Oka Raada Iddaru Krishnula Pelli	"Chilaka Chilaka"	Chakri	Shreya Ghoshal
2003	Aayudham	"Idevitamma Maaya Maaya"	Vandemataram Srinivas	
2003	Sriramachandrulu	"Sogasari Jaana"	Ghantadi Krishna	
2003	Mee Intikosthe Yem Istharu Maa Intikosthe Yem Thestharu	"Aa Devudi Varame Nuvvu"	Ghantadi Krishna	Sadhana Sargam
2003	Janaki Weds Sriram	"Mera Dil Tuhjko Diya"	Ghantadi Krishna	
2003	Charminar	"Godavarila"	Ghantadi Krishna	Malavika
2004	Sunday	"Gundela Maatuna"	Sri Sunil Dharma	Kavita Krishnamurti
2004	Malliswari	"Nee Navvule Vennelani"	Koti	Solo
2004	Intlo Srimathi Veedhilo Kumari	"Premannadi"	Ghantadi Krishna	Harini
2004	Apparao Driving School	"Ninu Choose Velalona"	Ghantadi Krishna	
2005	Kumkuma	"Nee Tholisariga Ninnu"	Ghantadi Krishna	
2006	Ramalayam Veedhilo Bhanu Madhumathi	"Manase"	Ghantadi Krishna	
2010	Prema Pilusthondhi	"Nee Kosam Raasanu"	Ghantadi Krishna	

== Malayalam film songs ==
Year	Film	Song name(s)	Music director(s)	Co-singer(s)
2015	Samrajyam II: Son of Alexander	Meghathin Meethada	R. A. Shafeer	Lekha

== Tamil film songs ==
Year	Film	Song name(s)	Music director(s)	Co-singer(s)
1997	Mannava	Yamma Yamma	Deva	

== Kannada film songs ==
Year	Film	Song name(s)	Music director(s)	Co-singer(s)
1991	Saajan	"Jeevisali Hege"	Nadeem–Shravan	TK Kala
1992	Hosa Kalla Hale Kulla	"Mounada Rathrige"	Hamsalekha	Solo
1992	Hosa Kalla Hale Kulla	"Amma Nanna"	Hamsalekha	Solo
2002	Roja	"Neenilladiddare"	Hamsalekha	Latha Hamsalekha
2002	Friends	"Devaru Varavanu Kotre"	G. Krishna	Solo
2002	Dhruva	"Dina Heege Ninne"	Guru Kiran	K. S. Chitra
2002	Devaru Varavanu Kotre	"Gulaabi Gulaabi"	Ramesh Krishna	Solo
2005	Inspector Jhansi	"Om Namo Namo"	Sameersen-Dilipsen	K. S. Chitra
2007	Chanda	"Nee Chandane"	S. Narayan	Shreya Ghoshal
2008	Moggina Manasu	"Om Namaha"	Mano Murthy	Solo
2008	Sathya In Love	"Sathya Is In Love"	Guru Kiran	Solo
2009	Kencha	"Oh Hrudaya"	Rajesh Ramanath	Solo
2009	Dubai Babu	"Pe Pe Dum Dum"	V. Sridhar	Solo
2009	Chellidaru Sampigeya	"Gelathi Gelathi"	S. Narayan	Shreya Ghoshal
2014	Sorry Kane	"Nee Baralu Moda"	Peter M. Joseph	Kavya
2017	Roja	"Na Nilla Didaare"	Hamsalekha	Latha Hamsalekha

== Oriya film Songs ==
Year	Film	Song name(s)	Music director(s)	Co-singer(s)	
1992	Baadshah	"Aa Aa Neendeon Aa"	R D Burman	solo	
1992	Kapala Likhana	"Geeta I Love You"	Akshay Mohanty	Kavita Krishnamurthy	
1999	Dharma Nikiti	"Nali Faraka Bali"	Deepak Kumar		solo
2006	My Love	"Tu Mote Bholo"		solo	
2006	Shranani	"Mu Kohudili"	Prem Anand	solo	
2006	Shranani	"Premo Eko Pakhi"	Prem Anand	solo	
2008	Love Fever	"A Jibana Nuhe"		Ira Mohanty	
2009	Prem Deewana	"Tomuku Mosute"	Samir Nag	solo	
2010	Mo Prema	"Jete Mu Korichi Pap"		solo	
2012	Priya	"Mote Ishq Gharichi"	Bikash Das	Chorus	
2012	Priya	"Phoguno Phoguno"	Bikash Das	Nibedita	
2012	Priya	"Premoro Prothomo"	Bikash Das	Nibedita	

=== Non-film Songs ===
Year	Film	Song name(s)	Music director(s)	Co-singer(s)
1993	Chaka Nayana	"Chaka Nayna"	N/A	solo
1993	Chaka Nayana	"Mun Kaliaara Puja Panda"	N/A	solo
1993	Chaka Nayana	"Pada Dhuli Tike"	N/A	solo
1993	Chaka Nayana	"Tulasi Pachare"	N/A	solo
1993	Rang Jawani	"Baja Bajila"	Bijay Swain Biju	solo
1993	Rang Jawani	"Ei Premo Sine"	Bijay Swain Biju	solo
1993	Rang Jawani	"Suna Gori"	Bijay Swain Biju	solo
1994	Suna Ellisee	"Suna Ellisee"		Anuradha Paudwal
1999	Kadambari	"Bapo Ghorojibe"	Saroj Nanda	solo
1999	Kadambari	"Ja Ja Jare"	Saroj Nanda	solo
1999	Kadambari	"Saato Sogoro"	Saroj Nanda	solo
1999	Puni Dheahaheba	"Tuma Nila Nila Akhi"	Bijay Swain Biju	solo
1999	Puni Dheahaheba	"Sapanare Niti"	Bijay Swain Biju	solo
1999	Puni Dheahaheba	"Padapu Jamiti"	Bijay Swain Biju	Kavita Paudwal
2002	Jibon Sathi	"Aankhi Se Ki Aankhi	Jibon Sathi	Nibedita
2002	Jibon Sathi	"Chalu Chalu"	Jibon Sathi	Nibedita
2002	Jibon Sathi	"Jibon Ta Jodi Hoye"	Jibon Sathi	Nibedita
2002	Jibon Sathi	"Ruposhi Manoku"	Jibon Sathi	solo
2011	Tu Mo Premika	"Tu Subah Sakalara"	N/A	solo
2011	Tu Mo Premika	"Mo Premika Manaku"	N/A	solo
2011	Tu Mo Premika	"Kagaj Danga Re Kagaja Danga"	N/A	solo
2011	Tu Mo Premika	"He Atita"	N/A	solo
2011	Tu Mo Premika	"Hajara Akhire Basa Mun"	N/A	solo
2011	Tu Mo Premika	"Ajibi Sei Barsa Rati"	N/A	solo
2011	Tu Mo Premika	"Sorisa Phulara"	N/A	solo
2011	Tu Mo Premika	"Abe Prema Karibaku Man"	N/A	solo
2013	Shalo Tinoti Mora	"Tu Mo Geeta"	Srikant Goutam	solo
2013	Shalo Tinoti Mora	"Tamaku Dekhila Pare"	Srikant Goutam	solo
2013	Shalo Tinoti Mora	"Shalo Tinoti Mora"	Srikant Goutam	solo
2013	Shalo Tinoti Mora	"Shaheru Aanesate Jhilo"	Srikant Goutam	solo
2013	Shalo Tinoti Mora	"Dhol Bajila"	Srikant Goutam	solo
2013	Shalo Tinoti Mora	"Sajani Go Sajani"	Srikant Goutam	solo
2013	Shalo Tinoti Mora	"Mu Kohibini Tu Kete Volo"	Srikant Goutam	Ira Mohanty
2016	Sindura	"Bou Ektu Paye"	Sarat Nayak	solo
2016	Sindura	"Chahe Nare Baku Toro"	Sarat Nayak	solo
2016	Sindura	"Hemoro Hrudoyo"	Sarat Nayak	solo
2016	Sindura	"Kacho Aye Na To"	Sarat Nayak	solo
2016	Sindura	"Premo Se Premo"	Sarat Nayak	solo
2016	Sindura	"Tomo Phone Paila"	Sarat Nayak	solo
2016	Sindura	"Tometo Asilo"	Sarat Nayak	solo
2016	Sindura	"Tomo Tharo Sundoro"	Sarat Nayak	solo
2021	Single	"Sajani Sajani"	Kumar Sanu, Krushnachandra Sabath	solo
2021	Single	"Rajahansi"	Kumar Sanu, Krushnachandra Sabath	solo
2021	Single	"Emiti Premika"	Kumar Sanu, Krushnachandra Sabath	solo
2021	Single	"Mana Chorani"	Kumar Sanu, Krushnachandra Sabath	solo
2022	Single	"Mane Achhina"	Kumar Sanu, Krushnachandra Sabath	solo

== Assamese songs ==
=== Film Songs ===
Year	Film	Song name(s)	Music director(s)	Co-singer(s)
1988	Priyotoma	"Niribili Nisha"		solo
2010	Anjaana	"Iman Bedona"	Jayanta Das	solo
2010	Anjaana	"Raatir Madhu Jonak"	Bipul Barua	Sangeeta Kakoti
2013	Ponkhi	"Kobita"	Bijay Kashyap	Mahalaxmi Iyer
2015	Soku Meli Sua	"Jiri Jiri"	Zubeen Garg	solo
2017	Basonar Phul	"Tumak Na Dekhile Oi Murjai"		Sunidhi Chauhan

== Punjabi songs ==
=== Non-film Songs ===
Year	Film	Song name(s)	Music director(s)	Co-singer(s)
1991	Saajan	"Rawan Te Rawan","Aa Khol Tu"	Nadeem-Shravan	Anupama Deshpande
2017	Mainu Ki Ho Gaya	"Mainu Ki Ho Gaya"		Mannat Noor
2012	Gal Sun	"Taga Tut Gaya"		Asha Bhosle
2015	Chapter V	"Har Pal"	DJ Vix	Solo

== Bhojpuri film Songs ==
Year	Film	Song name(s)	Music director(s)	Co-singer(s)	
1999	Tu Hamar Sathi Re	"Naina Milake"		solo	
1999	Tu Hamar Sathi Re	"Sathi Re"		Suresh Wadkar	
2004	Kuli (dubbed)	"Suniya Ki Bojh Uthai"	Rajesh Gupta, Ashok Bhadra	solo	
2004	Kuli (dubbed)	"Matka Garam Hoi To"	Rajesh Gupta, Ashok Bhadra	solo	
2006	Pyaar Mein Tohar Ude Chunaria	"Ab Ke Baras"		Kavita Krishnamurthy	
2006	Pyaar Mein Tohar Ude Chunaria	"Doodh Ke Jaisan"		Sadhana Sargam	
2006	Pyaar Mein Tohar Ude Chunaria	"Chudiya Jagave Tohar		Sharmile Kashyap	
2007	Bhai Hoke To Bharat Nihan	"Kehu Dekhe Lihi"	Ashoke Goyal	Bharat Sharma	Sadhana Sargam
2007	Khagadiya Wali Bhauji	"Jehno Ganga Ka Paani"	Chandra Bhushan Pradhan	solo	
2007	Maati	"Gori Tohar Gaon"	Rajesh Gupta	Poornima	
2007	Maati	"Madhosh Mohanbat Manba Mein"	Rajesh Gupta		
2007	Shammi Bhaiya	"Badarva Barsela"	Aman	Pamela Jain	
2008	Vidhata	"Photoya Se Tohra Hum"	Lal Sinha, Gunwant Sen	solo	
2009	Prem Ke Rog Bhail	"Hay Aa Gail"	Kumarjeet	Sadhana Sargam	
2009	Prem Ke Rog Bhail	"Pal Bhar Ke Judaai"	Kumarjeet	Sadhana Sargam	
2010	Dulhaniya Hum Le Jaib	"Jetna Tarpaibyu Tu Pyaar"	Vikram Chadda	solo	
2011	Tohare Bina Bhi Kya Jeena	"Jable Suraj Aur Chanda Rahi"	Raj Indra Raj	Priyanka Singh	
2012	Bhai Jee	"Man Karela Najariya"	Shyam Dihathi	Khushboo Jain	
2012	Saawariya I Love You	"Achra Kahe Sarkhela"	Shyam Dihathi	Khushboo Jain	
2014	Aag Laga Deb Jawani Mein	"Deewana Na Maange Heera Moti"	Yuvraj	Khushboo Jain	
2014	Jung	"Aisan Chehra"	Lal Singh	Sadhana Sargam	
2015	Na Pyaar Tute Kahete	"Tohari Dafli Baji"	Prashant	Khushboo Jain	

=== Non-film Songs ===
Year	Album	Song name(s)	Music director(s)	Co-singer(s)
2014	Tohari Piritiya	"Kehu Hamse Kahat"	Tapan Bhattacharjee	solo
2014	Tohari Piritiya	"Dil Mangloo"	Tapan Bhattacharjee	solo
2014	Tohari Piritiya	"Suno Suno Are E Bhaiya"	Tapan Bhattacharjee	solo

== Nepali film Songs ==
Year	Film	Song name(s)	Music director(s)	Co-singer(s)
1992	Dui Thopa Aansu	"Yo Dui Thopa Aansu"	Ranjit Gazmir	Sadhana Sargam
1992	Dui Thopa Aansu	"Sanchi Rakhu"	Ranjit Gazmir	solo
1993	Sapana	"Sapana Sapana"	Prakash Khadka	solo
1994	Aparadh	"Mo To Aayee"	Ranjit Gazmir	solo
1994	Swarga	"Mata Aba"	Sambhujeet Baskota	solo
1996	Chhoro	"Ab To Yeh Zindegani"	Sambhujeet Baskota	solo
2000	Mailee	"Bhare Aauchhu"	Sambhujeet Baskota	Devika Pradhan
2000	Timro Maya 99 Mero Maya 100	"Manko Mandirma"	Ranjit Gazmir	Sadhana Sargam
2000	Timro Maya 99 Mero Maya 100	"Purnimale Chandra Rojyo"	Ranjit Gazmir	Sadhana Sargam
2009	Arpan	"Bhool Bhaye Zindegi"	Bhupendra Rayamajhi	solo
2010	Hatya	"Yo Dilma"	Shakti Ballav Shreshtha	Kavita Krishnamurthy
2010	Hatya	"Hridaye Le Chhoi Rahu"	Shakti Ballav Shreshtha	Kavita Krishnamurthy
2010	Hatya	"Indramaya Ko"	Shakti Ballav Shreshtha	Kavita Krishnamurthy
2010	Junee Junee	"Ke Sandesh"	Suresh Ashikari, Prem Dhoj Pradhan	solo
2010	Junee Junee	"Junee Junee"	Suresh Ashikari, Prem Dhoj Pradhan	Sanjeevani

== Maithili film Songs ==
Year	Film	Song name(s)	Music director(s)	Co-singer(s)
2010	Sapna	"Piya Sang Preet Kona Hum Korbai"	Sujit Das	solo
2010	Sapna	"Tu Chhain Chanda"	Sujit Das	Khushboo Jain
2014	Half Murder	"Kaahe Zamana"	Sunil Pawan	solo

== Haryanvi film Songs ==
Year	Film	Song name(s)	Music director(s)	Co-singer(s)
2008	Top Gear	"Dil Legi Legi Re"	Baishnab & Ashok Barma	solo
2012	Priya	"Jabse Dekhi"		solo

== Rajasthani film Songs ==
Year	Film	Song name(s)	Music director(s)	Co-singer(s)
1997	Dev	"Hiwde Mein Baas Gaya Re"	Sunil Verman	Anupama Deshpande
2013	Dastoor	"Thhasu Pahla"		Sadhana Sargam

== Urdu film Songs ==
Year	Film	Song name(s)	Music director(s)	Co-singer(s)
1993	Haathi Mere Saathi	"Tum Din Main Suraj"	Nashad	Asha Bhosle
1993	Raaz	"Kaun Kehta Hai"	Irshad Sultan	Alka Yagnik
1993	Raaz	"Jab Tak Jaan Hai"	Irshad Sultan	solo
2003	Salakhain	"Vaada Hain Vaadon Ko"	M. Arshad	solo

== As A Composer ==
Year	Album	Song name(s)	Lyrics	Singer(s)	Language
2006	Utthaan	"Ab Neend Kise"	Sameer	Kumar Sanu, Alka Yagnik	Hindi
2006	Utthaan	"Ab Neend Kise" (remix)	Sameer	Kumar Sanu, Alka Yagnik	Hindi
2006	Utthaan	"Thok Dalega"	Sameer	Hema Sardesai	Hindi
2006	Utthaan	"Yeh Kaisa Utthaan Hai" (male)	Sameer	Sonu Nigam	Hindi
2006	Utthaan	"Abhi Tum Ho Kamsin"	Sameer	Kumar Sanu, Sapna Mukesh	Hindi
2006	Utthaan	Yeh Kaisa Utthaan Hai (female)	Sameer	Asha Bhosle	Hindi
2010	Besh Korechi Prem Korechi	"Brishti Bheja Tomay Dekhe"	Gautam Sushmit	Kumar Sanu, Sunidhi Chauhan	Bengali
2010	Besh Korechi Prem Korechi	Ek Poloker Dekha"	Gautam Sushmit	Kumar Sanu, Alka Yagnik	Bengali
2010	Besh Korechi Prem Korechi	"Tumi Kothay Acho"	Gautam Sushmit	Kumar Sanu, Kavita Krishnamurthy	Bengali
2010	Besh Korechi Prem Korechi	"Jibon Manei Sonar Horin Khoja"	Gautam Sushmit	Shaan	Bengali
2010	Besh Korechi Prem Korechi	"Sondhe Holei Loadshedding"	Gautam Sushmit	Abhijeet Bhattacharya	Bengali
2010	Besh Korechi Prem Korechi	"Tumi Amar Shudhu Amar"	Gautam Sushmit	Udit Narayan, Alka Yagnik	Bengali
2014	Yeh Sunday Kyun Aata Hai	"Rang Dharti Ke Liye" (female)	Sudhakar Sharma	Sunidhi Chauhan	Hindi
2014	Yeh Sunday Kyun Aata Hai	"Saawan Na Bheegi"	Sudhakar Sharma	Sunidhi Chauhan	Hindi
2014	Yeh Sunday Kyun Aata Hai	"Rang Dharti Ke Liye" (child)	Sudhakar Sharma	P. Susheela	Hindi
2014	Yeh Sunday Kyun Aata Hai	"Rang Dharti Ke Liye" (male)	Sudhakar Sharma	Kumar Sanu	Hindi
2014	Yeh Sunday Kyun Aata Hai	"Jisne Sapna Dekha"	Sudhakar Sharma	Kumar Sanu	Hindi
2014	Yeh Sunday Kyun Aata Hai	"Jagdu Dada Zindabad"	Sudhakar Sharma	Kumar Sanu, Khushboo Jain, Pamela Jain, Neelesh Kamath, Master Sameer, Tarannum Malik	Hindi
2014	Yeh Sunday Kyun Aata Hai	"Main Toh Hoon King"	Sudhakar Sharma	Master Sameer, Khushboo Jain, Shaan	Hindi
2014	Yeh Sunday Kyun Aata Hai	"Chadhkar Girna"	Sudhakar Sharma	Kavita Krishnamurthy	Hindi
2018	Single	"Raate Todal Ba Sajanwa"	Sagar Raj	Diya Singh	Bhojpuri
2019	Nabajiban Bima Company	"Tor Ichche Hole"	N/A	Arijit Singh	Bengali
2019	Nabajiban Bima Company	"Ekla Prithibi"	N/A	Sonu Nigam, Shreya Ghoshal	Bengali
2019	Nabajiban Bima Company	"Janina"	N/A	Shreya Ghoshal	Bengali
2019	Nabajiban Bima Company	"Urte Diyechi"	N/A	Sonu Nigam, Anweshaa	Bengali
2019	Nabajiban Bima Company	"Urte Diyechi 2"	N/A	Shaan, Alka Yagnik	Bengali
2019	Nabajiban Bima Company	"Kichu Kotha Chhilo"	N/A	Kumar Sanu	Bengali
2019	Nabajiban Bima Company	"Sei Tumi"	N/A	Sonu Nigam, Asha Bhosle	Bengali
2019	Nabajiban Bima Company	"Mon Jake Khujechhe"	N/A	Babul Supriyo, Mahalaxmi Iyer	Bengali
2019	Nabajiban Bima Company	"Dance With Me"	N/A	Kumar Sanu, Shannon, Shaan, Shreya Ghoshal	Bengali
2019	Nabajiban Bima Company	"Nabajiban Bima Company"	N/A	Abhijeet Bhattacharya	Bengali
2021	Single	"Maa Lo Maa"	Saranarabinda Ojha	Shibaprasad Nanda, Aseema Panda	Oriya

== Onscreen appearances ==
Year	Films	Role	Director	Music director	Produced	Production company	Ref.
1990	Aashiqui	Side Villain	Mahesh Bhatt		Gulshan Kumar	T-Series	
1991	Jeevandata	As himself	Vijay Chauhan - Sanjay Najan	Amar Kumar	Ashok Ostwal	Shree Ostwal Filma	
1992	Sapne Sajan Ke	As himself	Lawrence D'Souza	Nadeem-Shravan	Sudhakar Bokade	Divya Films Combines	
1997	Gaane Bhuban Bhoriye Debo	As himself		Putul Guha			
1999	Hum Aapke Dil Mein Rehte Hain	As himself	Satish Kaushik	Anu Malik	D. Rama Naidu	Suresh Productions	
2004	Swapne Dekha Rajkanya	As himself	Narayan Roy	Babul Bose	Ranjana Roy & Shib Prakash Sharma	Eco Entertainment Pvt. Ltd.	
2015	Dum Laga Ke Haisha	As himself	Sharat Katariya	Anu Malik	Aditya Chopra, Maneesh Sharma	Yash Raj Films	
2018	Kishore Kumar Junior	As himself	Kaushik Ganguly	Indraadip Dasgupta	Camelia Production Pvt. Ltd	Camelia Production Pvt. Ltd	

== See also ==
- List of awards and nominations received by Kumar Sanu
- List of Indian playback singers
- Indian Music Industry
