= Akhil Bandhu Ghosh =

Bengali singer (1920–1988)

- Born: 20 October 1920; Calcutta, Bengal Presidency, British India
- Died: 20 March 1988 (aged 67) SSKM Hospital, Calcutta, West Bengal, India
- Occupation: Singer

Akhil Bandhu Ghosh (Bengali: অখিলবন্ধু ঘোষ; 20 October 1920 – 20 March 1988) was a Bengali singer from Kolkata, West Bengal, India. He is considered as one of the greatest exponents of Bengali classical based vocal music.

== Early years ==
Akhil Bandhu Ghosh was born to Sri Bamandas Ghosh and Smt. Manimala Ghosh of Kolkata. In the early years he was a shy and introvert boy. He studied in Bhabanipur Nasiruddin Memorial School of Kolkata. Hemanta Mukherjee was one of his close friends since his childhood days. He received the first lessons in music from his maternal uncle Sri Kalidas Guha. Later he took lessons from Nirapada Mukhopadhyay, Tarapada Chakraborty and Chinmoy Lahiri.

== Personal life ==
He married Dipali Ghosh in 1947 and led a very happy married life. Dipali was Ghosh's disciple and a noted singer too. The childless couple devoted their life in teaching classical based vocal music to hundreds of disciples in their house located at 25, Turf Road, Bhabanipur, Kolkata.

== Career ==
Akhil Bandhu Ghosh published his first album in 1947 containing two songs in 78 RPM record; Ekti kusum jaabe and Amar kanone phutechhilo phul, though some of his unpublished songs were recorded much earlier. He was unparalleled in modern classical based Bengali songs and recorded many songs which became very popular. Some of these are: ‘আজি চাঁদিনি রাতি গো’ (Aji chadini rati go), ‘ওই যে আকাশের গায়ে, দূরের বলাকা ভেসে যায়’ (Oi je akasher gaye, durer balaka vese jay), ‘শিপ্রা নদীর বুকে সন্ধ্যা নামিল হায়’ (Shipra nadir buke sandhya namil hay), ‘তোমার ভুবনে ফুলের মেলা’ (Tomar bhubane fuler mela) etc.

For several years he was associated with the Bengal Music College, founded by Nanigopal Bhattacharya in 1940.

== Discography ==
List of songs sung or composed by Akhil Bandhu Ghosh (in alphabetical order)

Akhil Bandhu Ghosh discography
Year	Song	Singer	Type	Lyrics	Music	Record No./Other	Record Speed
1984	Aaj noy kaal	Akhil Bandhu Ghosh	Bengali Modern	Sayd Abul Hasan	Prabir Majumder	2226-1164	EP
1962	Aaji chNadini raati go	Akhil Bandhu Ghosh	Bengali Modern	Pulak Bandyopadhyay	Akhil Bandhu Ghosh	JNG 6134	78 RPM
1947	Aamar kanone phutechhilo phul	Akhil Bandhu Ghosh	Bengali Modern	Byomkesh Lahiri	Santosh Mukhopadhyay	JNG 5840	78 RPM
1950	Aamar somadhi pore	Akhil Bandhu Ghosh	Bengali Modern	Pabitra Mitra	Sudhirlal Chakraborty	H 1488	78 RPM
1977	Aami keno rohilam (Darbari Kanada)	Akhil Bandhu Ghosh	Classical based	Ratu Mukhopadhyay	Ratu Mukhopadhyay	JNLX 1021	LP
1963	Aami kotha dile kotha rakhi	Akhil Bandhu Ghosh	Bengali Modern	Pulak Bandyopadhyay	Akhil Bandhu Ghosh	JNG 6163	78 RPM
1960	Aami je piyasi	Akhil Bandhu Ghosh	Bengali Modern	Biswanath Bardhan	Akhil Bandhu Ghosh	JNG 6061	78 RPM
-	Aar toh chole na Radha	Akhil Bandhu Ghosh	Bengali Modern	Madhusudan Gupta	Akhil Bandhu Ghosh	TN 507	78 RPM
1965	Abhimani cheye dekho	Akhil Bandhu Ghosh	Bengali Modern	Pulak Bandyopadhyay	Santosh Mukhopadhyay	JNG 6198	78 RPM
1977	Barosar megh bhese jay (Surdasi Malhar)	Akhil Bandhu Ghosh	Classical based	Gauriprasanna Mazumder	Akhil Bandhu Ghosh	JNLX 1021	LP
1960	Bnashoriya bNashi bajaiyo na	Akhil Bandhu Ghosh	Bengali Modern	Shanti Bhattacharya	Akhil Bandhu Ghosh	JNG 6061	78 RPM
1949	Bol kemone jagai	Akhil Bandhu Ghosh	Bengali Modern	Gauriprasanna Mazumder	Anupan Ghatak	H 1440	78 RPM
1949	Chaiti godhuli jay	Akhil Bandhu Ghosh	Bengali Modern	Gauriprasanna Mazumder	Anupan Ghatak	H 1440	78 RPM
1977	Dekona taare (Shankara)	Akhil Bandhu Ghosh	Classical based	Gauriprasanna Mazumder	Akhil Bandhu Ghosh	JNLX 1021	LP
1947	Ekti Kusum Jobe	Akhil Bandhu Ghosh	Bengali Modern	Akhil Bandhu Ghosh	Santosh Mukhopadhyay	JNG 5840	78 RPM
1961	Emon dine Ma je amar	Akhil Bandhu Ghosh	Bengali Modern	Madhu Gupta	Akhil Bandhu Ghosh	JNG 6117	78 RPM
1984	Er naam ki bhalobasa	Akhil Bandhu Ghosh	Bengali Modern	Sayd Abul Hasan	Prabir Majumder	2226-1164	EP
-	Gokul chhariya Kala	Akhil Bandhu Ghosh	Bengali Modern	Shib Krishna Bandyopadhyay	Akhil Bandhu Ghosh	TN 507	78 RPM
1985	Guru mohe de gaye	Sandhya Mukhopadhyay	Bhajan	Kabir Das	Akhil Bandhu Ghosh	ECSD 41567	-
1984	Heso na jhore jaabe	Akhil Bandhu Ghosh	Bengali Modern	Sayd Abul Hasan	Prabir Majumder	2226-1164	EP
1977	Jaago jaago priyo (Vatiar)	Akhil Bandhu Ghosh	Classical based	Madhu Gupta	Akhil Bandhu Ghosh	JNLX 1021	LP
1980	Jalete sundori koinya	Akhil Bandhu Ghosh	Bengali Modern	Sunilbaran	Rotu Bandyopadhyay	JNGS 6354	SP
-	Jamuna kinare	Sandhya Mukhopadhyay	Bengali Modern	Pulak Bandyopadhyay	Akhil Bandhu Ghosh	GE 25490	45
1964	Je tomay sadhu sajay	Akhil Bandhu Ghosh	Bengali Modern	Pulak Bandyopadhyay	Akhil Bandhu Ghosh	JNG 6181	78 RPM
1977	Jete jete churi kore chay (Vairabi)	Akhil Bandhu Ghosh	Classical based	Ratu Mukhopadhyay	Ratu Mukhopadhyay	JNLX 1021	LP
1973	Jeno kichhu mone korona	Akhil Bandhu Ghosh	Bengali Modern	Pulak Bandyopadhyay	Dipali Ghosh	JNGS 6324	SP
1961	Kaar milon chao birohi	Akhil Bandhu Ghosh	Bengali Modern	Rabindranath Tagore	Rabindranath Tagore	Matrix No. OJE 17532 (unpublished)	Megaphone (republished 2003)
1959	Kabe achhi kabe nei	Akhil Bandhu Ghosh	Bengali Modern	Pulak Bandyopadhyay	Akhil Bandhu Ghosh	JNG 6046	78 RPM
1977	Kemone janabo (Tilak Kamod)	Akhil Bandhu Ghosh	Classical based	Gauriprasanna Mazumder	Akhil Bandhu Ghosh	JNLX 1021	LP
1953	Keno prohor na jete	Akhil Bandhu Ghosh	Bengali Modern	Gauriprasanna Mazumder	Dilip Sarkar	N 82547	78 RPM
1971	Keno tumi bodle gechho	Akhil Bandhu Ghosh	Bengali Modern	Pulak Bandyopadhyay	Akhil Bandhu Ghosh	JNGS 6295	SP
1965	Koyelia jaane	Akhil Bandhu Ghosh	Bengali Modern	Pulak Bandyopadhyay	Santosh Mukhopadhyay	JNG 6198	78 RPM
1952	Madol baja ore baja	Akhil Bandhu Ghosh, Utpala Sen, Bani Sengupta	Film: Meghmukti	Tarit Kumar Ghosh	Umapati Sil	-	-
-	Mane nei mon	Sandhya Mukhopadhyay	Bengali Modern	Pulak Bandyopadhyay	Akhil Bandhu Ghosh	GE 25490	45
1977	Marome mori go (Deshi Todi)	Akhil Bandhu Ghosh	Classical based	Pulak Bandyopadhyay	Akhil Bandhu Ghosh	JNLX 1021	LP
1950	Maromia baNshi	Akhil Bandhu Ghosh	Bengali Modern	Pabitra Mitra	Sudhirlal Chakraborty	H 1488	78 RPM
1953	Mayamrigo samo	Akhil Bandhu Ghosh	Bengali Modern	Gauriprasanna Mazumder	Durga Sen	N 82547	78 RPM
1977	Milano nishithe gele phire (Maj Khamaj)	Akhil Bandhu Ghosh	Classical based	Indrani Bhattacharya	Akhil Bandhu Ghosh	JNLX 1021	LP
1962	Nahoy mon dite tumi parona	Akhil Bandhu Ghosh	Bengali Modern	Pulak Bandyopadhyay	Akhil Bandhu Ghosh	JNG 6134	78 RPM
1948	Nutan Jiban Dekhao amare	Akhil Bandhu Ghosh	Bengali Modern	Dilip Sarkar	Dilip Sarkar	H 1301	78 RPM
1961	O dayal bichar karo	Akhil Bandhu Ghosh	Bengali Modern	Pulak Bandyopadhyay	Akhil Bandhu Ghosh	JNG 6117	78 RPM
-	O Rai ki byadhi hoilo	Akhil Bandhu Ghosh	Bengali Modern	Suren Chakraborty	Pankaj Mallick	GE 25007	78 RPM
1977	O go Shyam bihone brindabone (Pilu)	Akhil Bandhu Ghosh	Bengali Modern	Suren Chakraborty	Pankaj Mallick	JNLX 1021	LP
1977	Aami keno rohilam (Darbari Kanada)	Akhil Bandhu Ghosh	Classical based	Ratu Mukhopadhyay	Ratu Mukhopadhyay	JNLX 1021	LP
1971	Oi jah aami bolte bhule gechhi	Akhil Bandhu Ghosh	Bengali Modern	Pulak Bandyopadhyay	Akhil Bandhu Ghosh	JNGS 6295	SP
1959	Oi je akasher gay	Akhil Bandhu Ghosh	Bengali Modern	Shanti Bhattacharya	Akhil Bandhu Ghosh	JNG 6046	78 RPM
1948	Phaguner chaNd dube gelo	Akhil Bandhu Ghosh	Bengali Modern	Akhil Bandhu Ghosh	Akhil Bandhu Ghosh	H 1301	78 RPM
1954	Piyal shakhar phNake othe	Akhil Bandhu Ghosh	Bengali Modern	Gauriprasanna Mazumder	Akhil Bandhu Ghosh	N 82606	78 RPM
1973	Sarati jibon ki je pelam	Akhil Bandhu Ghosh	Bengali Modern	Pulak Bandyopadhyay	Dipali Ghosh	JNGS 6324	SP
1980	Se kemon nupur ogo	Akhil Bandhu Ghosh	Bengali Modern	Pulak Bandyopadhyay	Rotu Bandyopadhyay	JNGS 6354	SP
1977	Se kuhu yamini (Jayjayanti)	Akhil Bandhu Ghosh	Classical based	Madhu Gupta	Akhil Bandhu Ghosh	JNLX 1021	LP
1964	Sedin chNader alo	Akhil Bandhu Ghosh	Bengali Modern	Pulak Bandyopadhyay	Akhil Bandhu Ghosh	JNG 6181	78 RPM
1984	Sesh hoye elo na	Akhil Bandhu Ghosh	Bengali Modern	Sayd Abul Hasan	Prabir Majumder	2226-1164	EP
1954	Shipra nodir teere	Akhil Bandhu Ghosh	Bengali Modern	Shanti Bhattacharya	Akhil Bandhu Ghosh	N 82606	78 RPM
1977	Shono shono (Nag Ranjani)	Akhil Bandhu Ghosh	Classical based	Madhu Gupta	Arup Bhattacharya	JNLX 1021	LP
1949	Shrabano rajani sheshe	Akhil Bandhu Ghosh	Bengali Modern	Kamal Ghosh	Anupan Ghatak	H 1401	78 RPM
1949	Swapan parabarer teere	Akhil Bandhu Ghosh	Bengali Modern	Kamal Ghosh	Anupan Ghatak	H 1401	78 RPM
-	Swapane pohabe rajani	Akhil Bandhu Ghosh	Classical based	Tapan Bhattacharya	Dipali Ghosh	31008 Sagarika	Cassette
1963	Tomar bhubane phuler mela	Akhil Bandhu Ghosh	Bengali Modern	Pulak Bandyopadhyay	Akhil Bandhu Ghosh	JNG 6163	78 RPM
1961	Tumi mor paonai porichoy	Akhil Bandhu Ghosh	Bengali Modern	Rabindranath Tagore	Rabindranath Tagore	Matrix No. OJE 17532	Unpublished

== Legacy ==
Akhil Bandhu Ghosh's songs had become synonymous with the romantic ode in Bengali. Kabir Suman, an artist who initiated New wave in Bengali modern songs, mentioned Akhil Bandhu Ghosh in one of his compositions of 1970, বয়স আমার মুখের রেখায় (Bayas amar mukher rekhay), where it was said,

একলা লাগার সময় মানে
নিজের সঙ্গে কথা বলা
তারই ফাঁকে কোথায় যেন
অখিলবন্ধু ঘোষের গলা

When lonely moments get lonelier,
And we sink into ourselves talking to our inner self,
'Tis not hard to find, assuring and comforting as ever
The resonating voice of Akhil Bandhu Ghosh

== Death ==
On March 20, 1988, Ghosh came back from Andal attending a musical soiree, feeling unwell. He was admitted to P G Hospital first, and shifted to Sambhunath Pandit Hospital. He died in the afternoon, survived by his wife.
