= List of awards and nominations received by Kumar Sanu =

Kumar Sanu awards and nominations
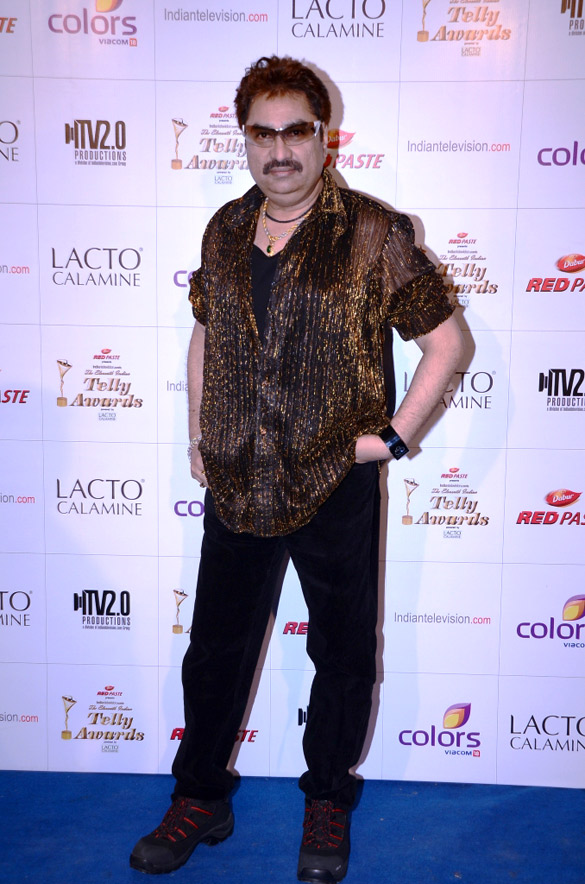
- Sanu in 2012
Awards and nominations
Award	Wins	Nominations

Totals (Note: Certain award groups do not simply award one winner. They acknowledge several different recipients, have runners-up, and have third place. Since this is a specific recognition and is different from losing an award, runner-up mentions are considered wins in this award tally. For simplification and to avoid errors, each award in this list has been presumed to have had a prior nomination.)
- Wins: 38
- Nominations: 16

Kumar Sanu (born 20 October 1957) is an Indian playback singer. He is known as the King of Melody in Bollywood. He is famous for singing thousands of Bollywood Hindi super hit songs. Also as one of the most successful playback singers of 90s era of Bollywood. Apart from Hindi, he has also sung in other languages including Bengali, Marathi, Nepali, Assamese, Bhojpuri, Gujarati, Manipuri, Telugu, Malayalam, Kannada, Tamil, Punjabi, Odia, Chhattisgarhi, Urdu, Pali, English and his native language Bengali, both in West Bengal and Bangladesh. He holds the record for winning five consecutive Filmfare Award for Best Male Playback Singer from 1991 to 1995. He holds the Guinness Book of world records since 1993 for recording the maximum number of songs in a single day.

For his contribution to Indian cinema and music, he was awarded the Padma Shri in 2009 by the Government of India. Many of his tracks feature in BBC's "Top 40 Bollywood Soundtracks of all time".

== Awards and nominations ==
=== Civil honours ===
Year	No.	Award	Honouring body
2001	1	31 March – Kumar Sanu Day: first Indian singer to achieve such honour in America	Michael R. Turner, Mayor, Dayton, Ohio, U.S.
2001	2	Doctorate (honorary)	University of America
2009	3	Padma Shri: India's 4th highest civilian honour	Government of India
2012	4	Dr. Ambedkar Awards	People Education Society
2014	5	Maharashtraratna Awards	Government of Maharashtra
2014	6	Mahanayak Samman Lifetime Achievement: as Bengali Playback Singer	Government of West Bengal
2015	7	Sangeet Samman Lifetime Achievement Award	Government of West Bengal
2017	8	Dr. Babasaheb Ambedkar Nobel Award	International Human Rights Council
2018	9	Felicitation at the UK Houses of Parliament, along with Anuradha Paudwal for contribution in Indian Music and also social services.	Indo-British All Party Parliamentary Group
2019	10	Bishesh Sangeet Mahasanman	Government of West Bengal
2021	11	Honoured with a Doctorate for his contribution to music. He has also been recognized with the Maharashtra Samman Award. Talking about the same, Sanu told IANS: "American University of USA has honoured me with the Nelson Mandela Nobel Peace Award. It is a Doctorate and the certificate came from the United States. The Governors of 120 countries have approved this. The award was given in Pune."	The American University of USA
2021	12	Lata Mangeshkar Award	Government of Madhya Pradesh
2022	13	Banga Bibhushan, Highest Civilian Award of West Bengal	Government of West Bengal
2023	14	Dr Babasaheb Ambedkar National Contribution Award, [National Award At Rajbhavan Mumbai]	Shri Bhagat Singh Koshiyari Honourable Governor Of Maharastra And Organiser Shri Gurubhai Sureshbhai Thakkar

=== Filmfare Awards ===
Won

Year	No.	Song	Film	Music director(s)	Lyricist
1991	1	"Ab Tere Bin"	Aashiqui	Nadeem-Shravan	Sameer
1992	2	"Mera Dil Bhi Kitna Pagal Hai"	Saajan	Nadeem-Shravan	Sameer
1993	3	"Sochenge Tumhe Pyaar"	Deewana	Nadeem-Shravan	Sameer
1994	4	"Yeh Kaali Kaali Aankhen"	Baazigar	Anu Malik	Dev Kohli
1995	5	"Ek Ladki Ko Dekha"	1942: A Love Story	R.D. Burman	Javed Akhtar

Nominated

Year	No.	Song	Film
1994	1	"Baazigar O Baazigar"	Baazigar
1995	2	"Kuch Na Kaho"	1942: A Love Story
1996	3	"Tujhe Dekha To"	Dilwale Dulhania Le Jayenge
1996	4	"Tu Mile Dil Khile"	Criminal
1998	5	"Do Dil Mil Rahe Hain"	Pardes
1999	6	"Ladki Badi Anjaani Hai"	Kuch Kuch Hota Hai
2000	7	"Aankhon Ki Gusthakiyaan"	Hum Dil De Chuke Sanam
2003	8	"Sanam Mere Humraaz"	Humraaz
2004	9	"Kisise Tum Pyar Karo"	Andaaz

=== Other awards ===
- 2025: #RukhRukhHotaHai Poll Winner - SRK x Kumar Sanu
- 2024 : ITA Music Legend Award at the 24th Indian Television Academy Awards
- 2016 : Featured in "Most searched and popular Indian singers on Google in the last 10 years"
- 2003 : Bollywood Music Award For "Best Artist of the Decade"
- 2003 : Nomination: IIFA Award for Best Male Playback for "Sanam Mere Humraaz" – Humraaz
- 2001: Nomination: Zee Cine Awards Best Playback Singer – Male for "Dil Ne Yeh Kaha Hain Dil Se" with Udit Narayan – Dhadkan
- 2001: Channel V Award For Best Male Playback for "Chand Sitare" – Kaho Naa... Pyaar Hai
- 2000 : Hero Honda Award For Best Playback Singer (Male) for "Aankhon Ki Gustakhiyan" – Hum Dil De Chuke Sanam
- 2000 : Kalashree Award For Best Male Playback for "Chaand Sitare" – Kaho Naa... Pyaar Hai
- 2000 : Nomination: IIFA Award for Best Male Playback for "Aankhon Ki Gustakhiyaan" – Hum Dil De Chuke Sanam
- 2000 : Nomination: MTV Award for "Dil Ne Yeh Kaha Hain Dil Se" with Udit Narayan and Alka Yagnik – Dhadkan
- 1999 : Mohammed Rafi Memorial Award for Best Playback Singer For "Aankhon Ki Gustakhiyaan" – Hum Dil De Chuke Sanam
- 1999 : Nomination: MTV Award for "Aankhon Ki Gustakhiyaan" With Kavita Krishnamurthy – Hum Dil De Chuke Sanam
- 1999 : Zee Gold Awards for "Aankhon Ki Gustakhiyaan" – Hum Dil De Chuke Sanam
- 1999 : Kalakar Awards for "Aankhon Ki Gustakhiyaan" – Hum Dil De Chuke Sanam
- 1999 : Stardust Award for Best Playback Singer For "Aankhon Ki Gustakhiyaan" – Hum Dil De Chuke Sanam
- 1999 : Anandalok Awards for Best Playback Singer (Male) Kumar Sanu for Aami Sei Meye
- 1998 : Lions' Club Gold Award For Best Playback Singer "Ladki Badi Anjaani Hai" – Kuch Kuch Hota Hai
- 1998: Nomination: Zee Cine Awards Best Playback Singer – Male for "Do Dil Mil Rahe Hain" – Pardes
- 1998: Nomination: Screen Awards Best Male Playback Singer for "Do Dil Mil Rahe Hain" – Pardes
- 1998 : Anandalok Awards For Best Playback Singer (Male) Kumar Sanu for Gane Bhuban Bhoriye Debo
- 1997 : BFJA Award for film Lathi
- 1996 : BFJA Award for film Kencho Khurte Keote
- 1996 : Channel V Award For Best Male Playback "Tujhe Dekha To Yeh Jaana Sanam" – Dilwale Dulhania Le Jayenge
- 1995 : Ashirwad Award For Best Male Playback "Ek Ladki Ko Dekha" – 1942: A Love Story
- 1995 : Screen Award for Best Male Playback for "Ek Ladki Ko Dekha" – 1942: A Love Story
- 1993 : Guinness World Records Award For "Most number of songs recorded in a day"

== See also ==
- Kumar Sanu discography and filmography
