= Amay Ektu Jayga Dao =

1998 song by Manna Dey

Song by Manna Dey

from the album Maa Amar Maa
- Language: Bengali
- English title: Please Give Me Some Space to Sit In the Temple of Maa
- Released: 1998
- Studio: Audio One, North Kolkata
- Genre: Devotional song
- Length: 4:54
- Label: Sony Music India
- Composer: Mrinal Bandyopadhyay
- Lyricist: Pulak Bandyopadhyay
- Producer: Buddhadeb Ganguly

"Amay Ektu Jayga Dao" (Bengali: আমায় একটু জায়গা দাও মায়ের মন্দিরে বসি) is a Bengali language devotional song sung by Indian playback singer Manna Dey, written by Pulak Bandyopadhyay and composed by Mrinal Bandyopadhyay. It is also known by the title "Amay Ektu Jayga Dao Mayer Mondire Bosi", from the album Maa Amar Maa.

The song was one of the last songs written by Pulak Bandyopadhyay, before he died by suicide from jumping into the Hooghly River. "Amay Ektu Jayga Dao" is considered to be the last historical hit song of its singer Manna Dey.

Initially given to composer Abhijit Banerjee, the song's music was later handed to Mrinal Bandyopadhyay as Pulak Bandyopadhyay was not satisfied. Mrinal Bandyopadhyay, after composing the music, sang it in Pulak's house. Upon finishing the songs, he did not see Bandyopadhyay in sight and later found him crying while standing in the balcony of his house. It was recorded in "Audio One" studio in North Kolkata and musically arranged by Buddhadeb Ganguly. Among other Shyama Sangeet performed by singers Pannalal Bhattacharya and Kumar Sanu, the song remains consistent.

A music video of Manna Dey singing the song while sitting on the terrace of the Dakhineswar Kali Temple was broadcast by Doordarshan during the years 1998–1999.

== Overview ==
In 1998, Pulak Bandyopadhyay's lyrics of the song were given to composer Abhijit Banerjee to compose its music. Pulak Bandyopadhyay was not satisfied with the music and remarked it as "not coming alive". The song was then given to Mrinal Bandyopadhyay to create a melody, which was approved by Pulak Bandyopadhyay.

Pulak Bandyopadhyay wrote the song while in his house at Salkia, Howrah. Mrinal Bandyopadhyay composed the first two songs of the album Maa Amar Maa, which were "Amay Ektu Jayga Dao" and "Jakhan Emon Hoy Jibonta Mone Hoy Byartho Aborjona". Mrinal Bandyopadhyay (Banerjee) sang them in Pulak Bandyopadhyay's house with his eyes closed. He did not find Bandyopadhyay in his sight when he opened his eyes. Mrinal Banerjee thought he had sung the songs to himself after Bandyopadhyay had left the house. He thought Bandyopadhyay had not liked the songs. Banerjee went around the house to find if Bandyopadhyay was inside. He was surprised to find that Bandyopadhyay was standing on the balcony with his back turned towards the door and crying. Bandyopadhyay remarked upon turning to him, "What a music you gave Mrinal! I wanted music just like this". (Note: Translated into English from the original in Bengali.) They were recorded in the "Audio One" recording studio on James Long Street in North Kolkata. The music was arranged for recording by Buddhadeb Ganguly.

The music video of the song aired on the television channel Doordarshan during 1998 and 1999. It showed Manna Dey singing the song while sitting on the terrace of the Dakhineswar Kali Temple. It was shown several times per day. After Manna Dey died, a cover version of "Amay Ektu Jayga Dao" was made including by his nephew Sudeb Dey and Kumar Sanu. Manna Dey had never sung devotional songs before the song and was about eighty years old when he sang the song and others from the album. He sometimes would be requested when at college functions to sing "Amay Ektu Jayga Dao Mayer Modnire Bosi". It is considered to be the last eternal hit of basic Bengali songs, being deemed to have the same importance and place as Amar Sadh Na Mitilo (Asha Na Furilo), another Shyama Sangeet (devotional song) first sang by Pannalal Bhattacharya.

Abhijit Banerjee, who the song was first composed by and given to, commented " 'Amay Ektu Jayga Dao' was first composed by me. I left it until the end. After listening to the songs by Manna Dey, I realized that I had composed the song while thinking about Manna Dey. But Mrinal composed the song thinking about 'Maa', that's why it became a milestone." The song is played on microphones (Note: "Microphone" here refers to horn loudspeakers used to play songs in Bengali pujas.) in Bengali Kali Pujas, alongside the songs of Kumar Sanu and Pannalal Bhattacharya. Pulak Bandyopadhyay wrote "Amay Ektu Jayga Dao" at a time when he showed boredom, exhaustion and despair. The song lines "আমি সবার পিছনে থাকব/ শুধু মনে মনে মাকে ডাকব/ কারও কাজে বাধা দিলে/ সাজা দিও যত খুশি" convey his feelings. Pulak Bandyopadhyay finished writing all of the songs of the album Maa Amar Maa a few months before he committed suicide by jumping into the Hooghly River from a ferry on the morning of September 7, 1999. The song is considered a Shyama Sangeet, and is also played sometimes in Diwali. Deep Maiti, an alumnus of the Jadavpur University, said to inform him if Manna Dey got a place to sit in the Temple of the Maa (Note: "Maa" is a term used in Indian languages, such as Bengali, to refer to a goddess.) or Kali. It became one of the most popular songs centered around Kali Puja in West Bengal.
