= Pulak Bandyopadhyay =

Indian lyricist (1931–1999)

- Born: 2 May 1931; Salkia, Howrah
- Died: 7 September 1999 (aged 68)
- Occupation: Lyricist

Ami khatar patay cheyechilam
Lyricist Pulak Bandyopadhyay, composer Manna Dey and singer Asha Bhonsle

Pulak Bandyopadhyay (Bengali: পুলক বন্দ্যোপাধ্যায়; 2 May 1931 – 7 September 1999) was a Bengali Indian lyricist and songwriter of Bengali cinema.

== Early life ==
He was born and brought up in Salkia, Howrah. His family had close links with art circles, in particular in drama, literature, and music. He was a graduate of the Scottish Church College, in Calcutta.

== Career ==
He experimented with various genres and in the process contributed richly to the evolution of musical compositions in Bengali cinema during the 1960s and 1970s. The sheer spontaneity of his compositions made him a much sought after lyricist. Famous Bengali and Bollywood artistes like Akhilbandhu Ghosh, Hemanta Mukherjee, Manna Dey, Kishore Kumar, Manabendra Mukhopadhyay, Geeta Dutt, Lata Mangeshkar, Asha Bhonsle, Haimanti Shukla, Shyamal Mitra, Bhupen Hazarika, Pratima Bandopadhyay, Utpala Sen, Arundhati Holme Chowdhury, Satinath Mukherjee, Madhuri Chattopadhyay, Anup Ghoshal and Arati Mukherjee sang his compositions. In 1966 film Sankhabela, he wrote two evergreen songs- "Ke Prothom Kachhe Esechhi" (Lata Mageshkar and Manna Dey) and "Aaj Mon Cheyechhe" (Lata Mangeshkar). In 1969 film Prothom Kadam Phool, he wrote "Ami Shri Shri Bhojo Hori Manna". In 1973 film Basanta Bilap, he wrote "O Shyam Jokhon Tokhon, Khelo Na Khela Emon".

== Death ==
On 7 September 1999, he committed suicide by jumping off a launch into the Hooghly river.

== Notable songs ==
- "Aaj mon cheyechhe"
- "Abar hobe to dekha"
- "Agoon legechhe"
- "Amar Bhalobasar Rajprasade"
- "Amar bolar kichhu chhilona"
- "Amay Ektu Jayga Dao"
- "Ami Agantuk"
- "Ami Gaan Shonabo Ekti Asha"
- "Ami sri sri Bhojohori Manna"
- "Ami tomar kachhei phire ashbo"
- "Basrai Golap Haate Dilam"
- "Boro saadh jaage ekbar tomai dekhi"
- "Bristi Bristi Bristi"
- "Dau dau dau jole duranto bonhi"
- "Doore doore kachhe kachhe"
- "Dorodi go"
- "Dweep jwele oi tara"
- "Ei Chhanda E Ananda"
- "Ekta Chithi dilam likhe"
- "Esho pran bhorono doinyo horono he"
- "Jakhon Keu Amake Pagol Bole"
- "Jani tomar premer jogyo ami to noi"
- "Jani Na Kakhon Tumi"
- "Ja Re Ja Ure Rajar Kumar"
- "Jato Bhabna Chilo"
- "Jeo Na Darao Bondhu"
- "Ke Jaane Ka Ghanta"
- "Ke Prothom Kache Esechi"
- "Kothay kothai je raat hoye jai"
- "Kotodin pore ele, ektu bosho"
- "Khopar Oi Golap Diye"
- "Lajboti nupurer rini jhini jhini"
- "Meghla bhanga rod uthechhe"
- "O Lolita, oke aaj chole jete bolna"
- "Ogo kajol noyona horini"
- "Phuleshwari"
- "Shedin tomay dekhechhilam"
- "Shei to abar kachhe ele"
- "Shey Amar Choto Bon"
- "Sobuj Pahar dake"
- "Tapur Tupur Bristi Jhore"
- "Tomar Bhubane Phuler Mela Ami Kadi Sharaye"
- "Tomar Daake Sara dite"
- "Tomar du chokhe amar swapno aanka"
- "Tomay keno laagchhe eto chena"
- "Tumi onek jotno kore amay dukkho dite cheyechho"
- "Tumi Shatodal Hoye Phute"
