= November 1976 =

Month of 1976

<<	November 1976					>>
Su	Mo	Tu	We	Th	Fr	Sa
	1	2	3	4	5	6
7	8	9	10	11	12	13
14	15	16	17	18	19	20
21	22	23	24	25	26	27
28	29	30

The following events occurred in November 1976:

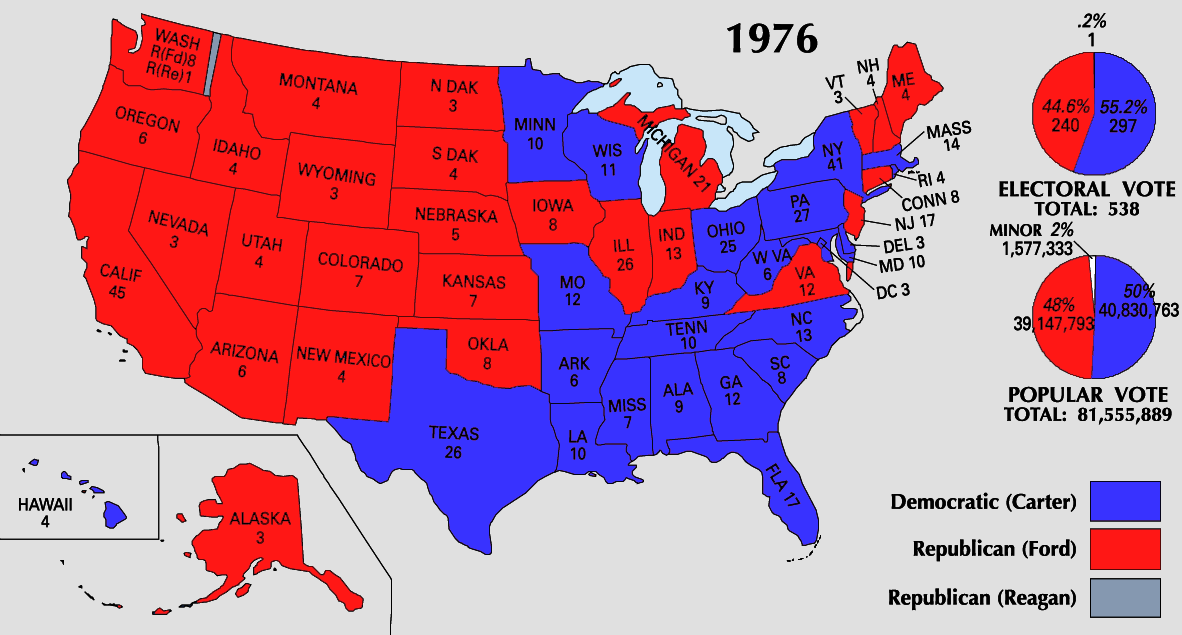
November 2, 1976: Jimmy Carter wins U.S. presidential election over President Gerald Ford

President-elect Jimmy Carter

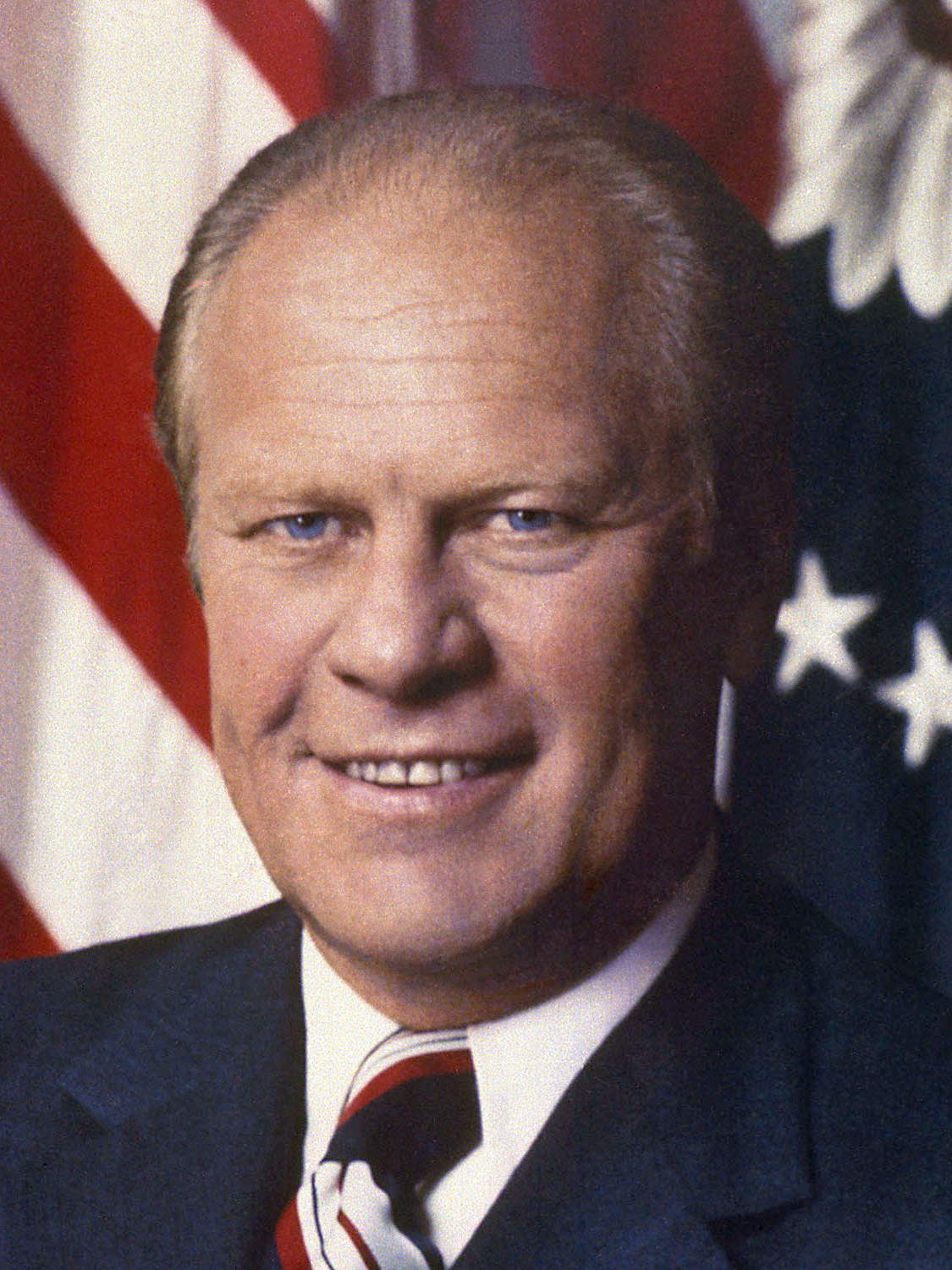
President Gerald Ford

== November 1, 1976 (Monday) ==
- Lieutenant Colonel Jean-Baptiste Bagaza of the Burundi Army led a bloodless coup d'état overthrowing President Michel Micombero, who had overthrown the monarchy of the African nation in 1966. The 30-member Supreme Revolutionary Council that replaced Micombero named Bagaza as President of Burundi on November 10.
- Universities and schools in Thailand reopened after having been closed for nearly a month because of violence that had led to a military coup d'état and closure on October 6.
- Born: Adah Almutairi, American nanotechnology engineer; in Portland, Oregon

== November 2, 1976 (Tuesday) ==
- Former Georgia Governor Jimmy Carter defeated U.S. President Gerald Ford to win the 1976 United States presidential election, becoming the first candidate from the Deep South to win since the Civil War. Carter received 297 electoral votes after narrowly winning Ohio and its 25 by a little more than 11,000 popular votes out of four million. Ford, who had 240 electoral votes, conceded the election at 3:30 the next morning in Washington, and telephoned his congratulations to Carter by telephone at 11:00 a.m.
- The first legislative elections in Cuba since 1958 took place with the indirect participation people who had voted in October 10 (with runoffs on October 17) for the members of Cuba's 169 municipal assemblies. Of more than 30,000 candidates, the 10,725 who had been selected as municipal legislators then chose the 469 deputies of the National Assembly of People's Power (Asamblea Nacional del Poder Popular).
- In Paris, a bomb destroyed the house of Jean-Marie Le Pen, leader of the Front National. Although six people were slightly injured, Le Pen and his family were unharmed. The perpetrators of the attack were never identified.
- Born:
  - Thierry Omeyer, former goalkeeper for the French men's national handball team; in Mulhouse
  - Kris Kaspersky (pen name for Nikolay Likhachev), Russian computer hacker; in Uspenskoye, RSFSR, Soviet Union (killed in skydiving accident, 2017)
  - Matt Cullen, U.S. ice hockey center and philanthropist who played 21 seasons and 1,594 NHL games for eight different teams from 1997 to 2019; in Virginia, Minnesota

== November 3, 1976 (Wednesday) ==
- Jacques Mayol of France became the first person to dive to a depth of 100 metres (330 ft) without the use of scuba gear. Mayol, age 49, held his breath and went down into the Mediterranean Sea off of the island of Elba.
- The worst railroad accident in Poland in more than ten years killed 25 people and injured 60 others after an express train crashed into the back of a passenger train that had been making a scheduled stop at the station at Julianka. The express between Lublin and Wrocław, traveling in a dense fog, came in behind the other train.
- Brian DePalma's horror film Carrie, based on the novel of the same name by Stephen King, premiered in select cities before going into general release nationwide on November 16.
- Born: Emiliano Reali, Italian novelist, in Rome
- Died: Henk Korthals, 65, Dutch politician and former Deputy Prime Minister of the Netherlands, 1959 to 1963

== November 4, 1976 (Thursday) ==
- U.S. District Court Judge Warren J. Ferguson declared that the Family Viewing Hour (actually a two-hour period between 7:00 and 9:00 in the evening Eastern time in which programs containing violent scenes and sexual content were not to be aired), instituted by the FCC, was unconstitutional as a violation of the First Amendment guarantees of freedom of speech. The suit had been brought by the Writers Guild of America, the Screen Actors Guild, and numerous production companies and had named the nation's three commercial TV networks (ABC, CBS and NBC). A decree made by the National Association of Broadcasters in 1975 was also overturned, giving stations free rein on what to air in the pre-prime time slots.
- Born: James Dale Ritchie, American serial killer; in Anchorage, Alaska (killed in police shootout, 2016)
- Died:
  - Edith Shackleton Heald, 91, British journalist
  - Massimo Dallamano, 59, Italian film director known for "Spaghetti Western" movies, was killed in an auto accident

== November 5, 1976 (Friday) ==
- India's Lok Sabha voted, 180 to 34 to postpone parliamentary elections for the second consecutive year. The 1976 elections had been canceled later in 1975. The ruling Congress Party was joined by India's Communist Party in approving the plan, while most opposition deputies continued their boycott of votes on legislation. After the vote by the Lok Sabha, and the approval of the ceremonial upper house (the Rajya Sabha), the 1977 voting was postponed until 1978.
- The first epidemic of Ebola virus was brought to an end as the last of 280 victims died. By November 20, the World Health Organization announced that the virus was contained. There would be no further epidemics until a new outbreak 19 years later in 1995. On suggestion by virologist Karl Johnson, the nation's health agency gave the illness the name "Ebola virus disease", after the Ebola River valley on November 30.
- Geoffrey Platt, a laboratory technician at the British Microbiological Research Establishment in Porton Down, Wiltshire, accidentally became the first European victim of the Ebola virus when he accidentally got pricked by a contaminated needle while handling samples from Africa. Platt was successfully treated with human interferon and convalescent serum and he fully recovered.
- In Rimini, the second and last Lotta Continua congress ended; during it, the party's political line was violently contested by the working-class base and above all by feminist militants. Adriano Sofri and the leading group decide to – de facto – disband the party, without an official act.
- In Sicily, a wave of rain and mud, coming from Mount Erice, devastated Trapani city and countryside, causing 16 victims.
- Born: Park Jung-chul, South Korean television star; in Seoul
- Died: Helen Purdy Beale, 83, American plant virologist known for her invention of the serology processes in identification of diseases that affect crops

== November 6, 1976 (Saturday) ==
- In India, as part of a program of compulsory sterilization instituted by a decree of Prime Minister Indira Gandhi during her proclaimed "national emergency", nearly 800 men were forced to undergo vasectomies in an event in the state of Haryana at the village of Uttawar.
- Dr. Zhores A. Medvedev, a prominent Soviet biochemist and dissident who was living in exile in London, revealed the occurrence of two disasters that had been kept secret by the Soviet Union's rulers, describing both in detail in the British scientific weekly New Scientist. Medvedev was the first to report two incidents now known as the Kyshtym disaster of 1957, in which an explosion of stored nuclear wastes contaminated an area inhabited by 270,000 people, and the Nedelin catastrophe, a rocket engine explosion that killed numerous rocket scientists and high-ranking Soviet military officers.
- Born:
  - Pat Tillman, American NFL player who left sports in order to join the U.S. Army war against al-Qaeda; in Fremont, California (killed by friendly fire, 2004)
  - Carlos Quintana, Puerto Rican boxer and 2008 World Boxing Organization welterweight champion; in Moca, Puerto Rico
  - Iresh Zaker, Bangladesh actor and business executive; in Dhaka
- Died:
  - Dr. Alexander S. Wiener, 69, American hematologist known for his discovery of the Rh factor and blood transfusion techniques.
  - Patrick Dennis (pen name for Edward Everett Tanner III), 55, American novelist known for the bestselling Auntie Mame: An irreverent escapade

== November 7, 1976 (Sunday) ==
- The prototype of the Dassault Falcon 50 business jet made its first flight.
- The Party of Labor of Albania (Partia e Punës e Shqipërisë), the Communist party of Albania, completed its five-year Congress at Tirana and re-elected Enver Hoxha, who had been the party's leader since its founding 35 years earlier. Hoxha, who had been the de facto leader of the Balkan nation for more than 30 years, was the last Stalinist in power in Eastern Europe. All twelve members of the Party of Labor Politburo were re-elected by the Central Committee, including Prime Minister Mehmet Shehu.
- Born: Mark Philippoussis, Australian pro tennis player, 1999 and 2003 Davis Cup team winner, 1998 U.S. Open and 2003 Wimbledon finalist; in Melbourne
- Died: Mathew Charles Lamb, 28, Canadian spree killer who shot four people in 1966 and then joined the Rhodesian Army after his release from custody, was accidentally killed by friendly fire from another member of his unit.

== November 8, 1976 (Monday) ==
- The British House of Commons voted confidence in the government of Prime Minister James Callaghan, on the issue of nationalizing Britain's shipbuilding and aircraft industries, by a margin of one vote, 311 to 310. Two other bills, regarding treatment of private patients in government, and giving labor wider jurisdiction over cargo away from ports, passed by only three votes, 310 to 307.
- Born: Brett Lee, Australian national cricket team bowler; 1999 to 2012; in Wollongong, New South Wales

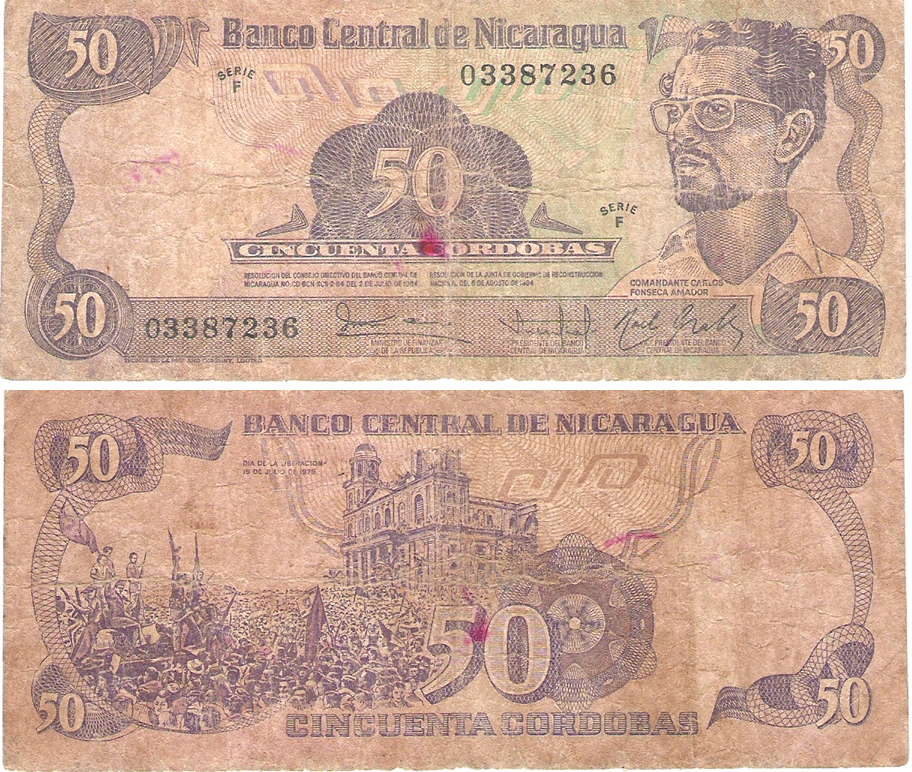
Carlos Fonseca

- Died:
  - Carlos Fonseca Amador, 40, founder (in 1969) and leader of the Sandinista National Liberation Front, was killed by Nicaraguan Army troops after being captured near the city of Waslala. Less than three years after Fonseca's death, the Sandinistas would succeed in toppling the government of Anastasio Somoza Debayle.
  - Gottfried von Cramm, 67, German tennis player, 1934 and 1936 French Open winner, finalist in Wimbledon three consecutive times, 1935 to 1937, was killed in an automobile accident in Egypt. Cramm was being driven home to Cairo from Alexandria when his car collided with an oncoming truck.
  - James Woodford, 83, English sculptor
  - Clara G. McMillan, 82, U.S. Representative for South Carolina from 1939 to 1941

== November 9, 1976 (Tuesday) ==
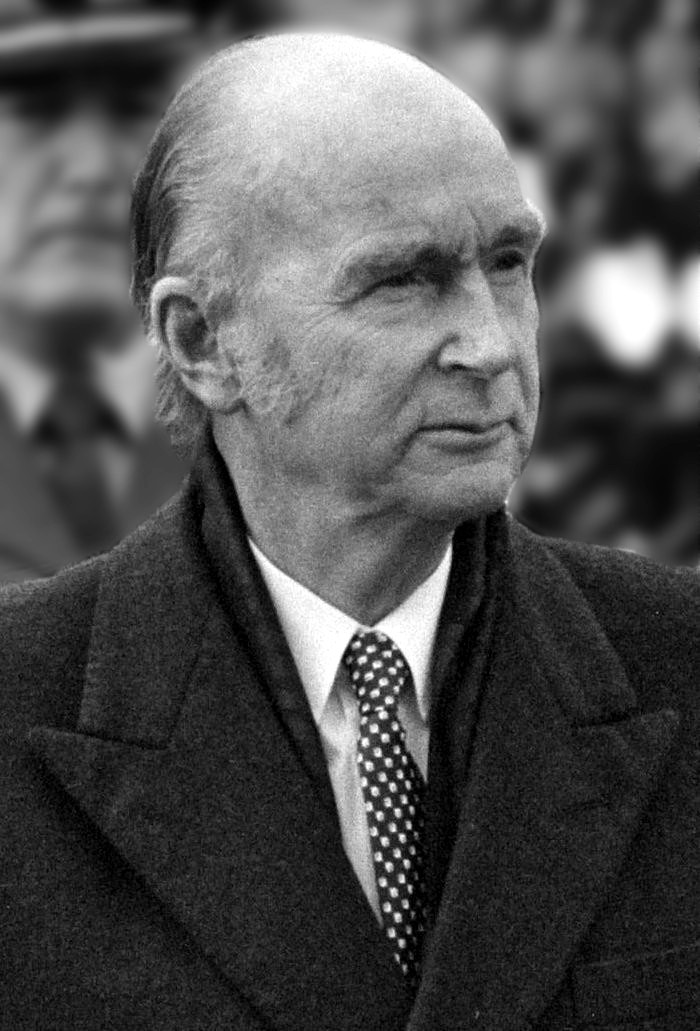
President Hillery

- Patrick Hillery was elected by default as the sixth President of Ireland, to be sworn in on December 3. Hillery, the European Commissioner for Social Affairs, was nominated as the candidate of Fianna Fáil. In that neither of the other two parties— Fine Gael and the Labour Party — nominated a candidate for the largely-ceremonial job, Ireland's Constitution allowed the government to dispense with voting.
- Born:
  - Joseph Benjamin, Nigerian film and television actor; in Makurdi, Benue State
  - Shahadat Hossain, Bangladeshi TV and film actor; in Barisal
- Died:
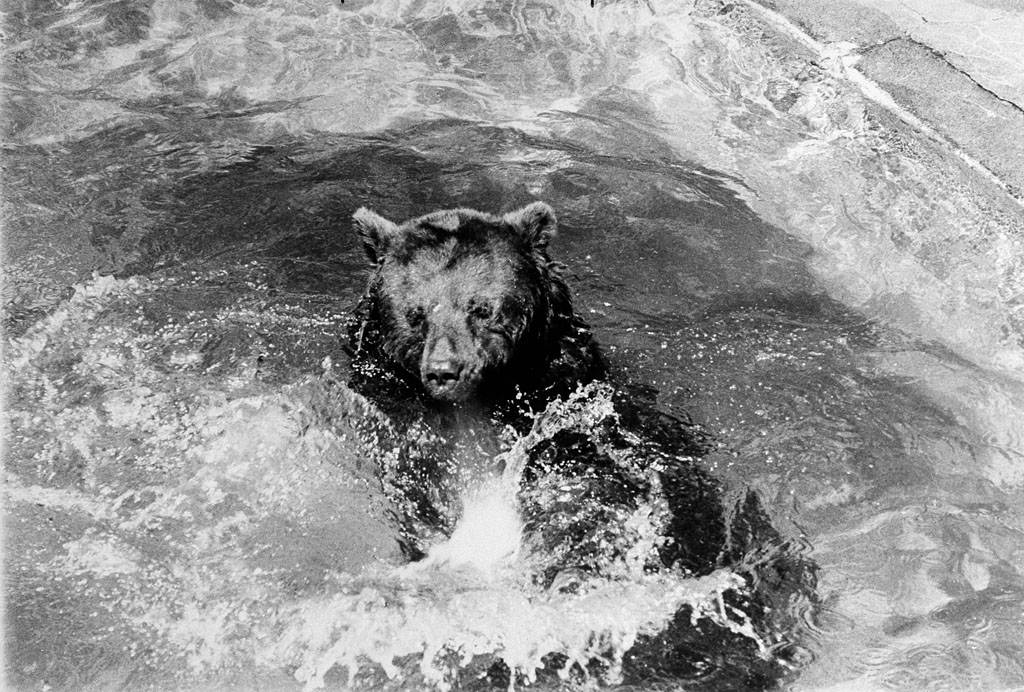
  S. Bear (1950-1976)
  - Smokey Bear, 26, American black bear and resident of the Washington National Zoo who became the living symbol of the United States Forest Service campaign to prevent forest fires after his 1950 rescue from a fire in New Mexico. His appearances in ad campaigns had ended after May 31, 1975.
  - Frankie Carbo, 72, Italian-born American boxing promoter and former Mafia hitman
  - Armas Taipale, 86, Finnish track athlete and discus thrower, 1912 Olympic gold medalist
  - Billy Halop, 56, former American child actor in the Dead End Kids series of films, from a heart attack

== November 10, 1976 (Wednesday) ==
- The Supreme Court of Utah ruled, 4 to 1, that convicted murderer Gary Gilmore was entitled to be executed as he had requested, and lifted a stay of execution that had been made earlier by the state's Court of Appeals, clearing the way for Gilmore to face a firing squad within five days. While the Governor of Utah issued a stay of execution the next day, Gilmore would be executed on January 17, 1977.
- At least 5,000 Syrian Army combat troops, accompanied by 60 tanks, entered peacefully into Beirut without firing a shot, marking the first time since 1958 that the capital of Lebanon had been under foreign military control. The United States Marines had landed in and occupied Beirut 18 years earlier to prevent a coup d'état.

== November 11, 1976 (Thursday) ==
- The Forty-second Amendment of the Constitution of India, authorizing dictatorial powers to the national government led by Prime Minister Indira Gandhi, was passed by the Indian Parliament's upper house (the Rajya Sabha), 191 to 0. The measure had passed the 521-member Lok Sabha, 366 to 4 (with the opposition boycotting the vote) on November 2. It would be ratified by at least half of India's 22 state legislatures and then signed into law by President Fakhruddin Ali Ahmed on December 18, and go into effect on January 3, 1977.
- Egypt's President Anwar Sadat announced that political parties, outlawed since the 1952 revolution, would be allowed with limitations. Although Sadat's Arab Socialist Organization remained the chief political party, the Liberal Socialist Party and the National Progressive Unionist Party, whose organizations had put forth candidates in the October 28 elections, were allowed to operate as well.
- Born: Rob Furlong, Canadian Army sniper who held the record (2002 to 2009) for furthest distance for a confirmed kill by a sniper, of 2.43 km (more than 1.5 miles); in Fogo Island, Newfoundland
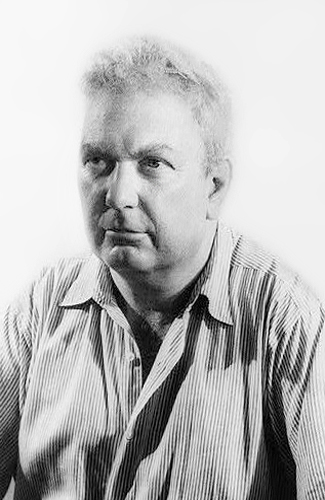

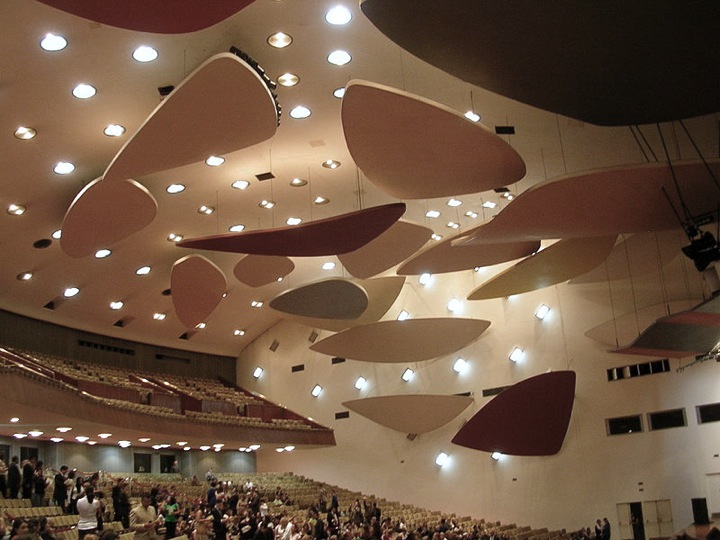
A Calder sculpture in Venezuela's Central University

Calder and a Calder sculpture in Venezuela
- Died:
  - Alexander Calder, 78, American sculptor and mechanical engineer known for creating the mobile after graduating from the Stevens Institute of Technology. Calder's first publicly-displayed mobile, Le Cirque Calder, was created in Paris in 1956 with images of circus acrobats and animals suspended from wire.
  - Narasingha Malla Deb, 69, the last ruler of the Indian princely state of Jhargram from 1916 until 1954 when the area was made part of the state of West Bengal

== November 12, 1976 (Friday) ==
- Britain's longest-running missing persons case began when Renee MacRae and her 3-year-old son Andrew disappeared from Inverness in Scotland. William MacDowell would be arrested for the crime more than 42 years later on September 11, 2019 and found fit to stand trial in 2021.
- The first mention of Star Wars came more than six months before the May 25, 1977 debut of the film, as Ballantine Books published the book Star Wars: From the Adventures of Luke Skywalker, a novelization adapted from the film script. Although authorship was credited to Star Wars creator George Lucas (who wrote the screenplay), the book itself was ghostwritten by Alan Dean Foster based upon the Lucas script.
- Born: Tevin Campbell, American singer and actor; in Waxahachie, Texas
- Died:
  - Walter Piston, 82, American classical music composer
  - Pedro Dot, 91, Spanish horticulturist and rose breeder known for creating the "Nevada" rose

== November 13, 1976 (Saturday) ==
- A second earthquake struck the Chinese city of Tangshan, which had been destroyed by an earthquake on July 28.
- Lieutenant Colonel Edouard Nzambimana was named as the new Prime Minister of Burundi.
- Angola's National Museum of Anthropology was opened in Luanda to preserve Angola's heritage.
- The first of 18 editions of the celebrity sporting competition Battle of the Network Stars premiered on the U.S. television network ABC with 10 TV stars apiece (six actors and four actresses) from the three television networks that existed in the United States at that time (ABC, CBS and NBC) in various sports (tennis, golf, volleyball), racing in running, swimming and bicycling; and a tug-of-war competition at the end between the two network teams that had done the best. The show, hated by TV critics, "drew a surprisingly large audience" as the 12th highest rated program of the week.

== November 14, 1976 (Sunday) ==
- Members of the church of which U.S. President-Elect Jimmy Carter was a member, the Plains Baptist Church of Plains, Georgia, voted to drop a ban that the church had maintained since 1965 against attendance by non-white people, after Carter spoke to the congregation prior to the evening's vote. In 1965, the church had voted to ban attendance by African-Americans. By a vote of 120 to 66, the church members amended the bylaws with a statement of purpose "to open the doors to all who want to worship Jesus Christ."

== November 15, 1976 (Monday) ==
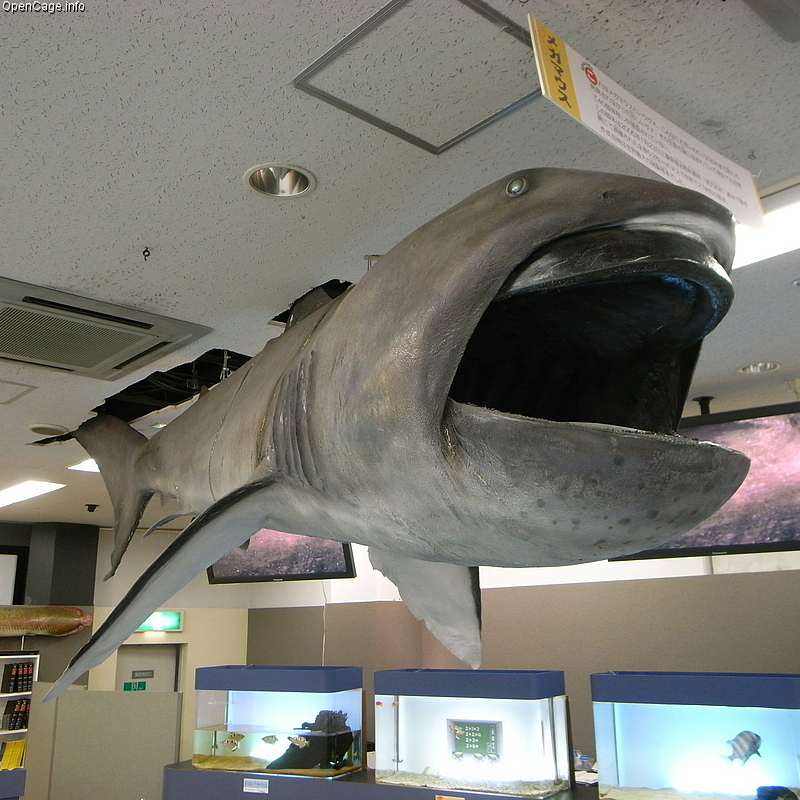
Megamouth

- The first megamouth shark (Megachasma pelagios) was discovered off the island of Oahu at Hawaii, when it became entangled in the anchor cable of a United States Navy ship, AFB-14, at a depth of about 540 feet (160 m).
- The Parti Québécois, a separatist party advocating the independence of the Canadian province of Quebec as a separate nation, won 71 of the 110 seats in elections for the provincial legislature, overwhelmingly defeating the Quebec Liberal Party, which lost all but 26 of the 102 seats it had held before the vote. Rene Levesque became the new Premier of Quebec, replacing the QLP's Robert Bourassa.
- Japan began the return of the Soviet Union's stolen MiG-25 jet fighter to the Soviets. Thirty crates, each filled with parts from the advanced jet fighter (which had been disassembled for study after Russian pilot Viktor Belenko defected to Japan) had been loaded onto the Russian freighter Taigonos on November 12 at the port of Hitachi and would arrive on November 18.
- Britain's parliament passed an act amending the Motorcycle Crash Helmet Act of 1972 to permit Sikh wearers of turbans to be exempt from the requirement of wearing a helmet. The legislation followed a four year campaign by Manchester resident Gyani Sundar Singh Sagar, popularly known as Gyan Ji, who had been repeatedly arrested by defying the law in the name of his religious faith.
- Multiparty elections were allowed in Brazil for the first time in over a decade as part of a gradual reform promised by the right-wing military government of General Ernesto Geisel, with voting for aldermen and mayors in the South American nations 3,789 municipalities. Although the government's Alliance for National Renewal was unopposed in 1,789 locations, the opposition Brazilian Democratic Movement had candidates in the other 2,000. An accident killed 38 people who were being transported to the polling location, when the driver of a bus failed to stop at a ferry crossing and fell into the Urubu River.
- Born: Claudia Llosa, Peruvian film director; in Lima
- Died: Jean Gabin (stage name for Jean-Alexis Moncorgé), 72, French film actor

== November 16, 1976 (Tuesday) ==
- The government of Chile, led by General Augusto Pinochet, announced that it would release all but 20 of the 343 people it considered "political prisoners", those held without being charged with a crime during the state of siege that had existed in the South American nation since the coup d'état that had overthrown President Salvador Allende on September 11, 1973. Another 900 people who had been convicted of security offenses, or were charged and awaiting trial, remained incarcerated and were not considered to be political prisoners by the government. The next day, Chile released 130 political prisoners from the Tres Alamos detention camp near Santiago.
- East Germany singer and poet Wolf Biermann, a dissident opposed to that nation's Communist government, was informed while on a concert tour of West Germany that he had been deprived of his East German citizenship and would not be allowed to return. In response, thirteen of East Germany's best-known artists and authors, all risking their careers, signed a letter to the government announcing that "We protest against his being stripped of his citizenship. Within two days, more than 70 other leading East German playwrights, actors, directors and singers had joined the protest.
- Died:
  - Robert L. Lippert, 67, American film producer and cinema chain owner
  - Niwa Kawamoto, 113, Japanese woman who had been the oldest living person in the world since the death of Mito Umeta on May 31, 1975.

== November 17, 1976 (Wednesday) ==
- In an operation ordered by King Hussein of Jordan, commandos of the Army of Jordan landed by helicopter on the roof of the Intercontinental Hotel in Amman and overpowered four Palestinian guerrillas who had taken guests and employees hostage. In the gunbattle, three gunmen, two hotel employees and two Jordanian soldiers were killed.
- The British government ordered the expulsion from the United Kingdom of former American CIA agent Philip Agee, describing him as a threat to national security. The move, by Home Secretary Merlyn Rees, came less than 24 hours after the British had ordered the deportation of Mark Hosenball, an American reporter working for Evening Standard newspaper of London. Hosenball had been cited in a letter from the Home Office, delivered to the newspaper office by two policemen on November 16, with Rees stating that "Mr. Hosenball has, while resident in the United Kingdom, in consort with others sought to obtain and has obtained for publication information harmful to the security of the United Kingdom and... this information has included information prejudicial to the safety of servants of the Crown."
- Sir Deighton Lisle Ward became the new Governor-General of Barbados, replacing the late Arleigh Winston Scott, who had died on August 9, 1976.

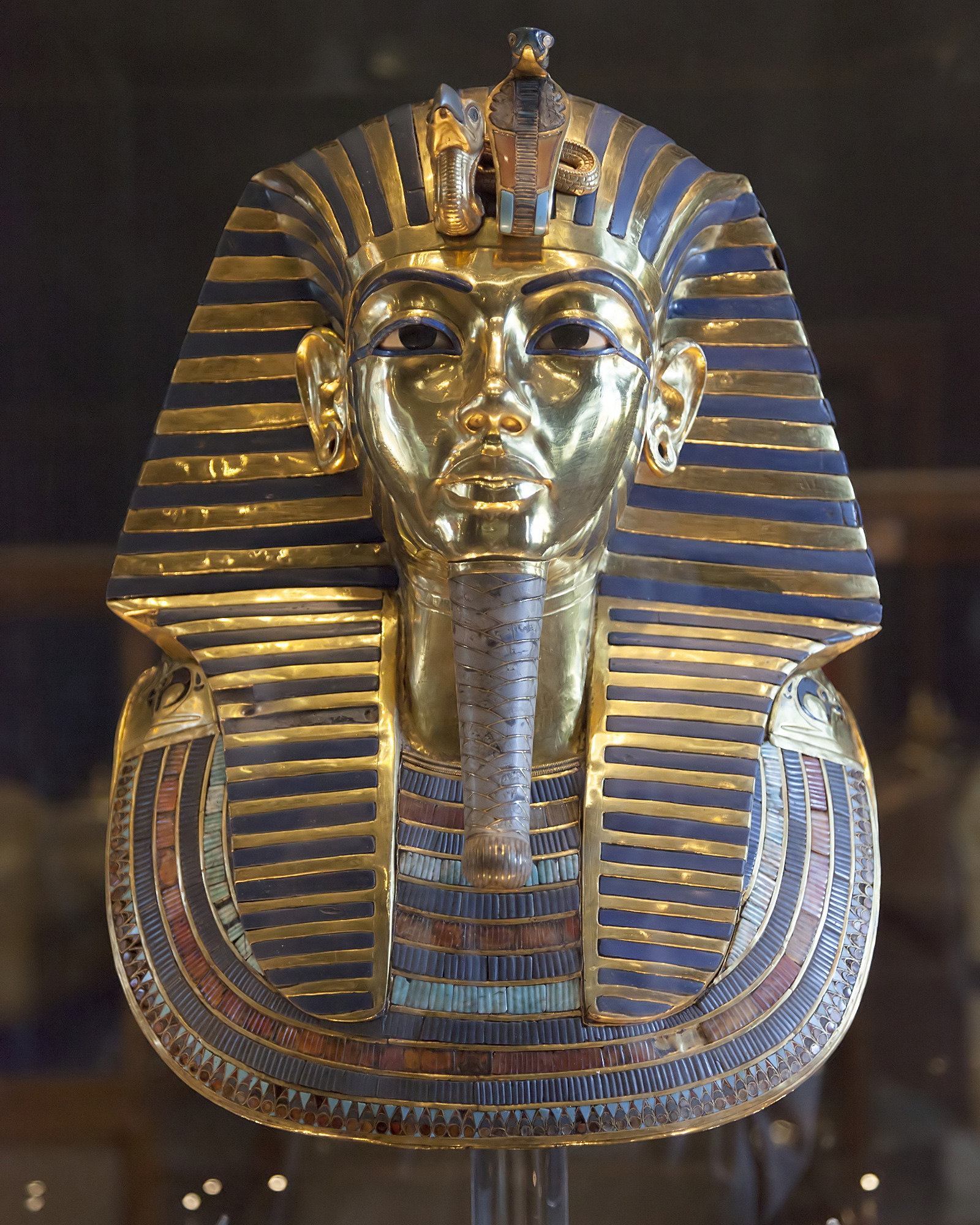
King Tutankhamun's funerary mask

- In the U.S., the National Gallery of Art opened a 7-city tour of the United States for the popular "Treasures of Tutankhamun" exhibit to display part of the treasures recovered from the Tomb of Tutankhamun (the remains of King Tut, who reigned from 1332 BC to 1323 BC, stayed in Egypt). The display began in the Gallery at Washington, D.C., then moved to Chicago's Field Museum, followed by the New Orleans Museum of Art, the Los Angeles County Museum, the Seattle Art Museum, New York City's Metropolitan Museum of Art and San Francisco and sold 10 million of tickets, with crowds camping out on the museum's grounds in order to be guaranteed the chance to see the pharaoh.
- Born:
  - Diane Neal, American television actress known for Law & Order: Special Victims Unit; in Alexandria, Virginia
  - Brandon Call, American television child actor known for Step by Step; in Torrance, California
- Died: Philip Taft, 74, American labor historian known as co-author (in 1935 with Selig Perlman) of History of Labor in the United States, 1896–1932 and for nine books regarding the history of the American Federation of Labor and other labor unions.

== November 18, 1976 (Thursday) ==
- The members of Spain's Parliament, the Cortes Generales, voted 425 to 59 to approve democratic elections for a new parliament, and effectively "voted itself out of existence." Nearly all of the legislators had been appointed by the nation's dictator, General Francisco Franco, who had died on November 20, 1975, after ruling Spain for almost 40 years. The proposal was approved overwhelmingly in a referendum on December 15 and the first elections for the Congress of Deputies and for the Senate would take place on June 15, 1977.

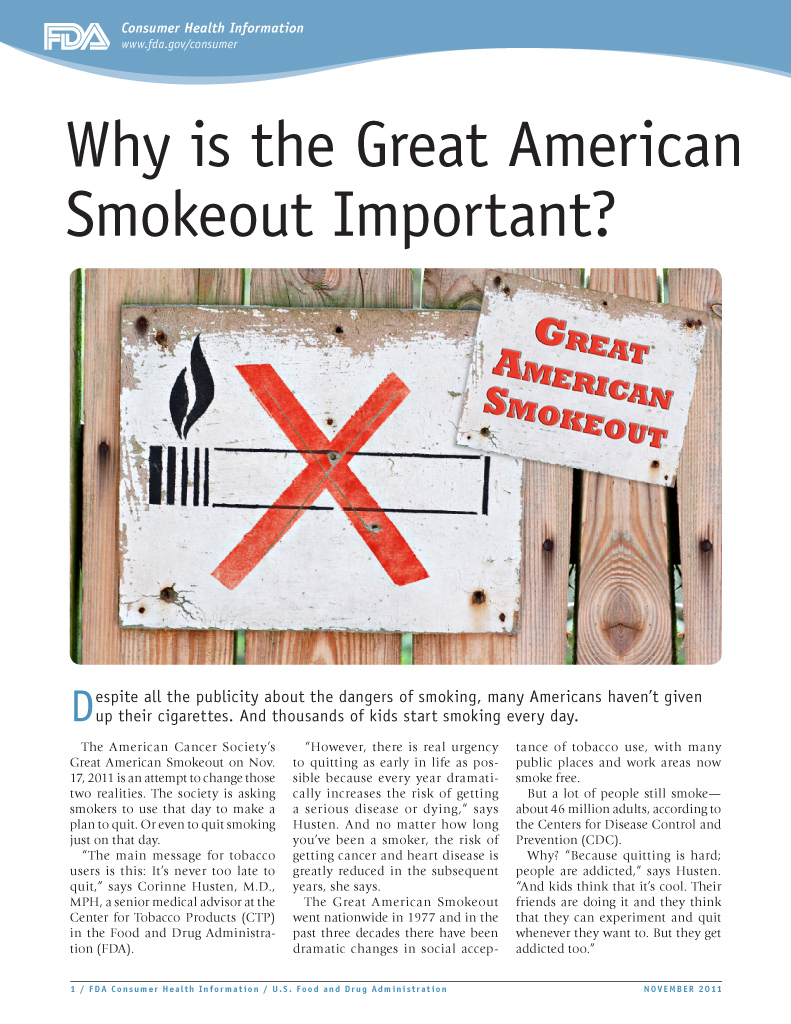
Smokeout

- In an event preceding the inaugural Great American Smokeout of 1977, one million residents of California were persuaded by the American Cancer Society to give up smoking cigarettes for an entire day. Surveys of smokers in California differed as to its effectiveness.
- Born: Jack Dorsey, American entrepreneur and co-founder (in 2006) of Twitter; in St. Louis
- Died:
  - Man Ray (stage name for Emmanuel Radnitzky), 86, American-born French photographer known for his photograms, which he referred to as "rayographs"
  - Louis G. Cowan, 66, former President of the CBS Network and the creator of several popular TV quiz shows, including The $64,000 Question, was killed along with his wife in an accidental fire at his apartment at the Westbury Hotel in New York City
  - Alfred Jerger, 87, Austrian opera singer

== November 19, 1976 (Friday) ==
- Evita, a musical about the life of the late Eva Peron and produced and recorded by Andrew Lloyd Webber and Tim Rice, was released as a concept album in the UK, in the same manner that Webber and Rice had produced Jesus Christ Superstar in 1970. The popular record album would be produced as a West End theatre musical, Evita, debuting on June 21, 1978.
- The parliamentary members of West Germany's Christian Social Union of Bavaria (CSU) voted, 30 to 18, to end the alliance they had had with the Christian Democratic Union (CDU) since West Germany came into existence in 1949. The CDU/CSU ticket had failed to win a majority in the October 3 election for West Germany's lower house of parliament, the Bundestag. The split lasted only 24 days, and by December 13, the alliance between the CSU and CDU was restored.
- Voters in Algeria overwhelmingly approved a new constitution, restoring the People's National Assembly (suspended for more than 11 years since a 1965 coup d'état) and allowing for the direct election of the President. The new document confirmed, however, that the ruling National Liberation Front would be the only legal political party.
- Patricia Hearst, found guilty of bank robbery earlier in the year for a crime committed after she was kidnapped, was released from prison pending the appeal of her case after her millionaire father posted a bond of $1.5 million dollars.
- Australian media entrepreneur Rupert Murdoch, who would later form the Fox Broadcasting Network, purchased New York City's afternoon newspaper, The New York Post from its owner and publisher, Dorothy Schiff.
- Born: Benny Vansteelant, Belgian duathlon champion; in Torhout (died from complications of injuries, 2007)

== November 20, 1976 (Saturday) ==
- Thailand's 24-member military junta, which had been leading the Asian kingdom since a coup d'état in October 6, announced its appointment of a new National Assembly of 340 people, more than half of whom were current or former military officers, and most of whom were considered to be right-wing politically. The junta stated further that it would act in "a purely advisory capacity" to the civilian Prime Minister" while still making clear its position on principal folicy decisions.
- With only 11 days left in his term, Mexico's President Luis Echeverria Alvarez began implementing a policy of land reform, ordering the government confiscation of 220,000 acres (89,000 ha) of land owned by wealthy families, for redistribution to poorer families under the public policy that every Mexican peasant had a right to a piece of land. The decision was overturned on December 7 by a Mexican federal judge.
- A landslide in the Colombian village of Chámeza, located in the departamento of Casanare killed 20 people as a row of huts were swept away and buried.
- Born: Dominique Dawes, American gymnast; in Silver Spring, Maryland

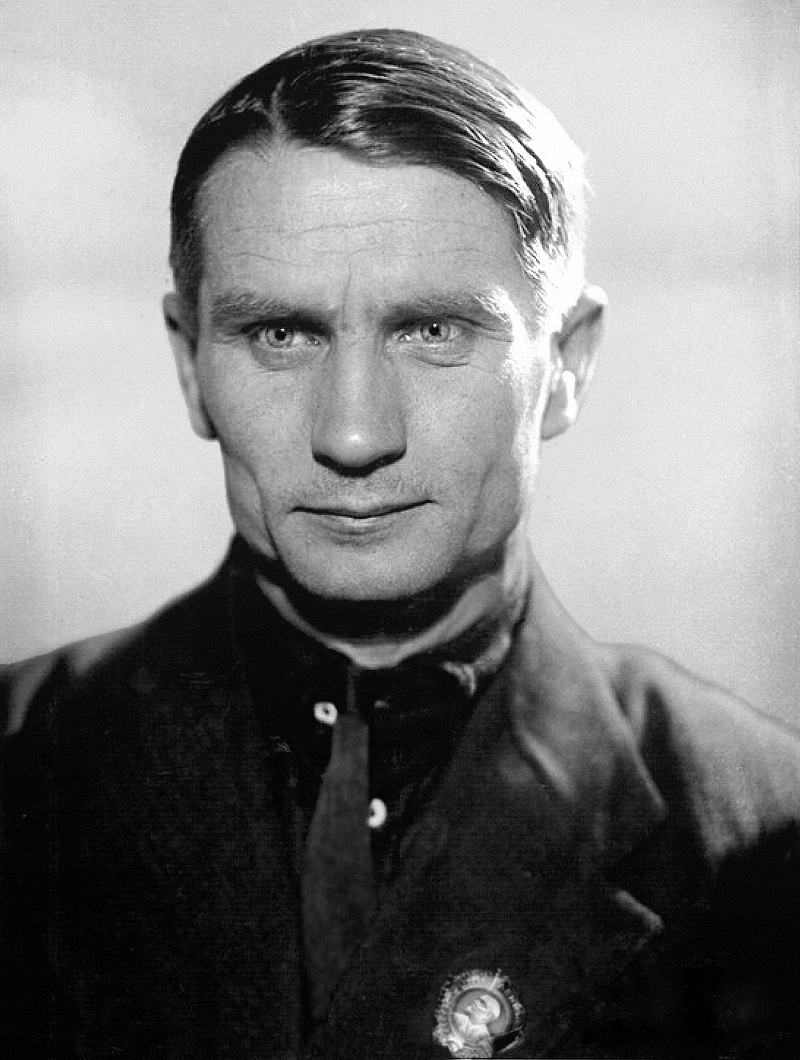
Trofim Lysenko

- Died:
  - Trofim Lysenko, 78, controversial, but influential, Soviet geneticist and botanist whose pseudoscientific theories were blamed for famines in the Soviet Union and later the People's Republic of China
  - Hugh D. Auchincloss, 79, American stockbroker, former father-in-law of U.S. President John F. Kennedy as stepfather of Jackie Kennedy

== November 21, 1976 (Sunday) ==
- The Accord on the Transportation of Perishable Foods (ATP), signed on September 1, 1970, by Austria, West Germany, Italy, Luxembourg, Netherlands, Portugal, and Switzerland, went into effect upon ratification by five states, and now applies to food shipment through 50 nations, mostly European but also the U.S. and Saudi Arabia.
- Shahab Sheikh Nuri, Anwar Zorab and Mamosta Jafar Abdulwahid, Iraqi Kurdish nationalists and leaders of the Komalay Ranjdaran organization, were jointly executed by the government of Iraq.
- Born: Daniel Whiston, English ice dancer; in Blackpool, Lancashire
- Died: Niles Welch, 88, American stage and silent film star

== November 22, 1976 (Monday) ==
- The British House of Lords, the upper house of Parliament whose approval of measures passed in Commons was usually taken for granted, overwhelmingly voted to reject the government-sponsored measure to nationalize Britain's aircraft and shipbuilding industries, with only 90 in favor and 197 against. The Lords refused to accept the bill as written and insisted on exemptions from takeover for ship-repairing companies that had made a profit.
- The popular newspaper comic strip Cathy, written by adveritising agency vice president Cathy Guisewite, made its debut and began a run of almost 34 years, concluding on October 3, 2010. Described as "by a woman and about a woman" and distributed by Universal Press Syndicate, Cathy was in 1,400 newspapers at its peak and was reprinted in more than 20 books and inspired three animated TV specials.
- The United Kingdom's Energy Act 1976 received royal assent, empowering the British Secretary of State to control the production, supply, acquisition and use of fuels and electricity, and included measures for the conservation of fuels.
- Born:
  - Torsten Frings, German soccer football midfielder and with 79 appearances for the Germany national team; in Würselen, West Germany
  - Sultan Munadi, Afghanistan journalist (killed by friendly fire, 2009)
- Died: Jesse F. McClendon, 95, American physiologist and inventor of the McClendon pH-probe to measure the acidity of a patient's stomach contents

== November 23, 1976 (Tuesday) ==
- All 46 passengers and four crew on Olympic Airways Flight 830 were killed when the turboprop airliner crashed into a mountain near the village of Servia during its flight from Athens to Kozani. Cleared to fly at 5,500 feet (1,700 m), the plane impacted the mountain in foggy weather at 4,625 feet (1,410 m).
- The Nuclear Emergency Search Team (NEST), created in the U.S. in 1974 to respond to threats of nuclear terrorism, carried out its first known mission in responding to a threat, by a group that called itself "Days of Omega", to contaminate the city of Spokane, Washington by explode containers, each with five pounds of nuclear waste from the nearby Hanford Nuclear Plant, throughout the area unless it received a $500,000 extortion demand. NEST agents found no evidence of increased radioactivity in the area and found that the threat was a hoax. The matter was kept secret until its revelation 19 months later on the first episode of the ABC News show 20/20.

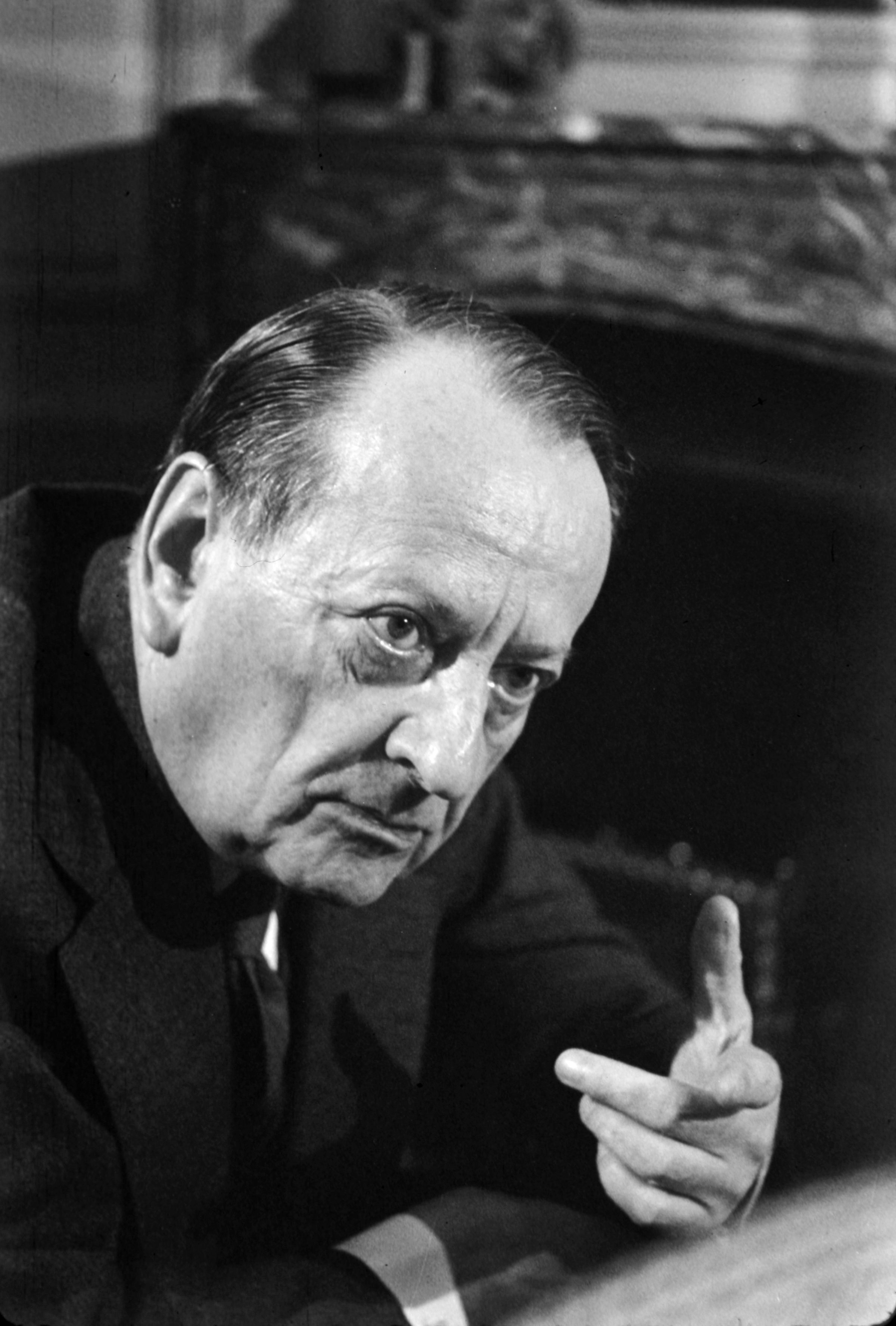
Malraux

- Born: Chiril Gaburici, Prime Minister of Moldova for four months in 2015; in Loganesti, Moldavian SSR, Soviet Union
- Died: André Malraux, 75, French novelist and former Minister of Cultural Affairs; in Paris

== November 24, 1976 (Wednesday) ==
- More than 4,000 people were killed in a 7.3 magnitude earthquake with an epicenter at Muradiye in eastern Turkey. The quake struck at 2:45 in the afternoon local time (1225 UTC) near Turkey's border with the Soviet Union and Iran. At least 500 died in Muradiye alone.
- A U.S. District Judge ruled in favor of Robert C. Randall in Randall v. United States, the first decision in the U.S. to permit the use of marijuana as a medical necessity. Randall had sued the U.S. Food and Drug Administration (FDA), the Drug Enforcement Administration (DEA), the National Institute on Drug Abuse, the U.S. Department of Justice, and the U.S. Department of Health, Education & Welfare (HEW) to permit him to cultivate and use marijuana based on a physician opinion that it would be medically necessary to halt the progression of his glaucoma.
- Cuba ended its policy, in place since the Cuban Revolution of 1959, of allowing free calls from public telephones. According to the official government newspaper Granma, the privilege had been abused by the general public. The move came after, because of waste of resources, the recent rescinding of allowing households free running water.
- Official criticism of Deng Xiaoping by the government of China appeared to have come to an end when Party Chairman Hua Guofeng laid the cornerstone for the Mausoleum of Mao Zedong being constructed in Beijing. Although the Gang of Four was mentioned, Chairman Hua's speech made no condemnation of Vice Premier Deng, who had been the victim of a second purge since shortly after the death of Premier Zhou Enlai.
- Born:
  - Chen Lu, Chinese figure skater, 1995 world champion; in Changchun, Jilin Province
  - Vladimir Cvijan, Serbian politician and chief advisor to President Boris Tadić from 2004 to 2010 until forming an opposition political party; Cvijan abruptly disappeared from public view in 2014 and was the victim of a drowning in 2018.
  - Mandla Hlatshwayo, South African actor; in Soweto, Johannesburg (murdered 2017)

== November 25, 1976 (Thursday) ==
- The United States and Mexico signed a prisoner-exchange treaty to allow several hundred Americans, incarcerated in Mexican prisons, to return to the U.S. to complete their sentences in American jails, and to allow the estimated 1,200 Mexican inmates of U.S. jails to be repatriated to Mexico if they wished. Neither the U.S. nor Mexico had ever signed a prisoner exchange agreement before.
- Syria and Iraq announced that they were both pulling back their military forces that had been concentrated along the Middle Eastern nations' mutual border.
- West German theoretical physicist Burkhard Heim publicly introduced, for the first time, his completed unified field theory in a presentation, including the methodology for calculating the mass spectrum of elementary particles, to engineers at Messerschmitt-Bölkow-Blohm (MBB).
- Born: Donovan McNabb, American NFL quarterback known for his all-star career with the Philadelphia Eagles; in Chicago
- Died:
  - Theodor Rosebury, 72, British-born American expert on oral microbiology, dealing with diseases of the mouth
  - Fernando María Castiella, 68, Spanish Minister of Foreign Affairs, 1957 to 1969

== November 26, 1976 (Friday) ==
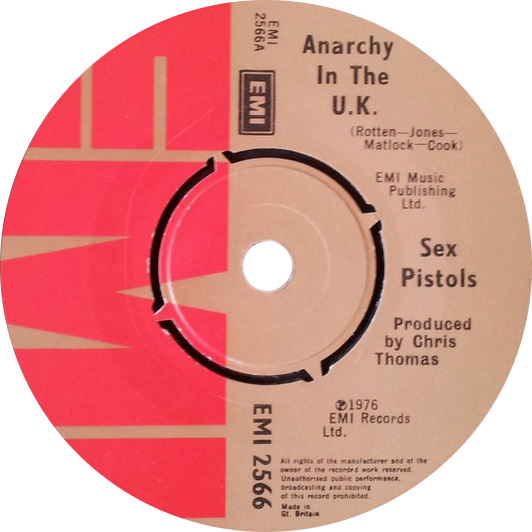
"Anarchy in the U.K."

- The first punk rock song, "Anarchy in the U.K.", was released by EMI Records after being recorded by the Sex Pistols on October 17.
- At least 10 people were killed, and 76 injured, in the explosion of a ruptured natural gas line in Barrientos, a suburb in northern Mexico City. The blast occurred when a mechanical digger struck the pipeline while excavating.
- The trademark for Microsoft was officially registered with the Office of the Secretary of the State of New Mexico. On the application, the registrants noted that the name (based on "microcomputer" and "software") had been in continuous use since November 12, 1975.
- The Warsaw Treaty Organization joint secretariat was established.
- Born: Maia Campbell, American TV actress known for In the House; in Takoma Park, Maryland
- Died: Marcel Delgado, 75, Mexican-born U.S. film effects specialist known for his development of stop motion animation for film with models, notably for King Kong

== November 27, 1976 (Saturday) ==
- The first multiracial title fights in South Africa (between the highest-ranked white competitor and highest-ranked black) were held at the Rand Stadium in Johannesburg, as part of a plan to allow boxers from the racially-segregated nation to compete in fights sanctioned by the world's pro boxing organizations. In the first bout, black middleweight champ Elijah 'Tap Tap' Makhatini beat white champion Jan Kies in the third round to become the undisputed South African middleweight champion. Gerrie Coetzee (who would become the World Boxing Association champion in 1983) defeated the top black challenger James Mathatho with a seventh round knockout for the heavyweight title.
- Born: Jaleel White, African-American television actor and comedian known for portraying the popular character Steve Urkel on the TV sitcom Family Matters; in Culver City, California
- Died: Sarah Stewart, 71, American cancer researcher and viral oncologist

== November 28, 1976 (Sunday) ==
- Aeroflot Flight 2415 crashed shortly after taking off from Moscow on a flight to Leningrad, killing all 67 passengers and six crew. The Tupolev Tu-104B departed in bad weather at 6:53 local time and lost altitude while banking to the right, coming down 6 miles (9.7 km) from the airport and exploding on impact.

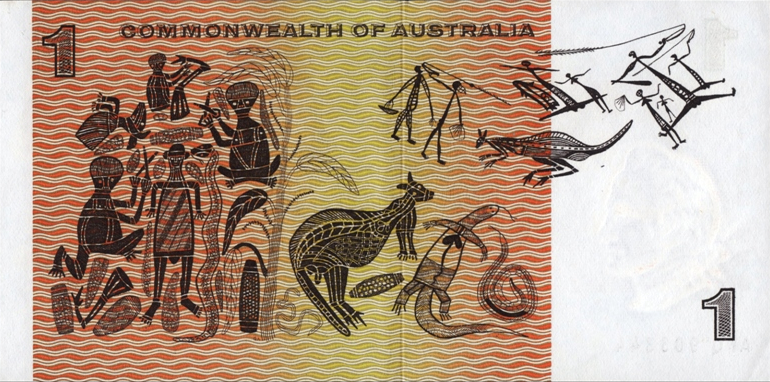
Australian dollar, 82 cents

- The government of Australia, led by Prime Minister Malcolm Fraser, ordered the devaluation of the Australian dollar by 17½ percent in order to increase the demand for its exports to other nations and to encourage foreign investment and increase its foreign exchange reserves. At the end of trading on November 26, the AUD had been worth almost US$1.24. The new value, 82½ % of its previous level, was about $1.02.
- The incident that would become the basis for a 1988 documentary film, The Thin Blue Line took place when Dallas, Texas police officer Robert W. Wood was shot and killed, in a murder for which Randall Dale Adams was wrongfully convicted. Wood, a highway patrolman one of only four American Indians on the Dallas police force, had made a routine traffic stop of an automobile when he was shot five times.
- The incident that would become the basis for a 2008 documentary film, Harry: A Communication Breakdown, took place when Harry De La Roche, Jr., a military academy cadet at The Citadel, shot and killed his parents and his two younger brothers while on furlough for the Thanksgiving holiday.
- The annual championship of the Canadian Football League was played between the "Rough Riders" and the "Roughriders", the Ottawa Rough Riders won the Grey Cup, defeating the Saskatchewan Roughriders, 23 to 20. Ottawa trailed, 16 to 20, with 0:20 left to play until Tom Clements threw the winning touchdown pass to Tony Gabriel.
- The Brady Bunch Variety Hour earned high ratings as a Thanksgiving weekend TV special on the ABC television network, marking the first reunion of almost all of the cast of The Brady Bunch, which had gone off the air more than two years earlier. The success of the show would become a weekly series, The Brady Bunch Hour, in January, and reunions would follow in 1981, 1988 and 1990 on the two other U.S. networks.
- Born: Ryan Kwanten, Australian TV actor and comedian; in Sydney
- Died:
  - Rosalind Russell, 69, American film actress and comedian
  - Len Harvey, 69, Welsh professional boxer who had fought in all five of the weight classes (flyweight, welterweight, middleweight, light‐heavyweight and heavyweight) during his career, and who had won a championship in three weight classes during his 25-year career. Within the British Commonwealth he was middleweight champion (1929 to 1933), light heavyweight champ (1939 to 1942) and heavyweight champ twice (1934 and 1939 to 1942).

== November 29, 1976 (Monday) ==
- The New York Yankees signed free agent Reggie Jackson, formerly of the Oakland A's and the Baltimore Orioles, to a five-year $2,960,000 contract. His salary increase, from $140,000 to $600,000 a year, set the precedent for lucrative multi-year contracts for Major League Baseball players in years to come.
- The Fourier–Deligne transform was first proposed by Belgian mathematician Pierre Deligne as an analog to the 150-year-old Fourier transform created by French mathematician Joseph Fourier.
- Twenty-nine people in Kenya were killed in the wreck of the overnight Mombasa to Nairobi express train when it ran into floodwaters at the town of Kathekani. Because the train carried an estimated 600 people, initial reports worldwide indicated a much larger death toll, later revised to 29 based on the number of bodies recovered.
- Born:
  - Chadwick Boseman, American film actor known for Black Panther and its sequels, as well as for his portrayals of Jackie Robinson, James Brown and Thurgood Marshall; in Anderson, South Carolina (died of cancer, 2020)
  - Anna Faris, American TV actress known as the star of the sitcom Mom; in Baltimore
- Died:
  - Godfrey Cambridge, 43, African-American comedian and film actor, died from a heart attack while filming the made-for-TV movie Victory at Entebbe, in which he was cast as Ugandan dictator Idi Amin
  - Judith Lowry, 86, American stage and TV actress best known for the role of "Mother Dexter" in the sitcom Phyllis in 1975 and 1976

== November 30, 1976 (Tuesday) ==
- West German police arrested lawyer Siegfried Haag, one of the leaders of the terrorist group the Red Army Faction (also known as the "Baader-Meinhof Gang") and another member, Roland Meyer, after pulling their vehicle over on the highway between Frankfurt and Kassel. Both were later sentenced to 14 years imprisonment.
- The emirates of Dubai and Sharjah, both states of the United Arab Emirates, agreed to settle the ongoing boundary dispute that had existed for more than 20 years, by submitting the matter for arbitration by the Federal Supreme Council. The Council eventually decided to go with the recommendations of J. P. Tripp, at the time the British political agent for the Trucial States.
- Died:
  - Marshal Ivan Yakubovsky, 64, Soviet Army officer and commander-in-chief of the Warsaw Pact forces since 1967
  - Laurie Erskine, 82, Scottish-born American children's author noted for the Renfrew of the Royal Mounted series of books
