= December 1976 =

Month in 1976

<<	December 1976					>>
Su	Mo	Tu	We	Th	Fr	Sa
			1	2	3	4
5	6	7	8	9	10	11
12	13	14	15	16	17	18
19	20	21	22	23	24	25
26	27	28	29	30	31

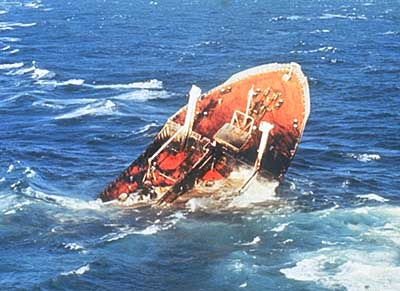
December 21, 1976: Oil tanker Argo Merchant spills its contents onto U.S. state of Rhode Island

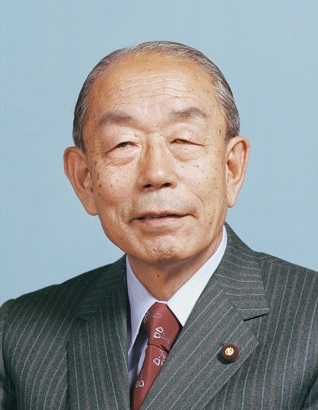
December 24, 1976: Takeo Fukuda selected as new Prime Minister of Japan

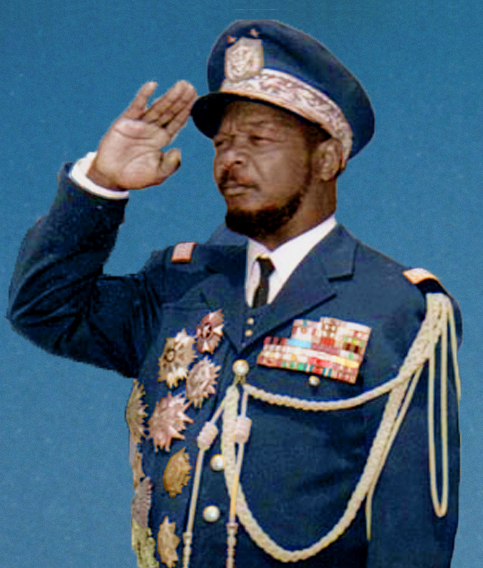
December 4, 1976: "Central African Empire" proclaimed by "Emperor Bokassa the First"

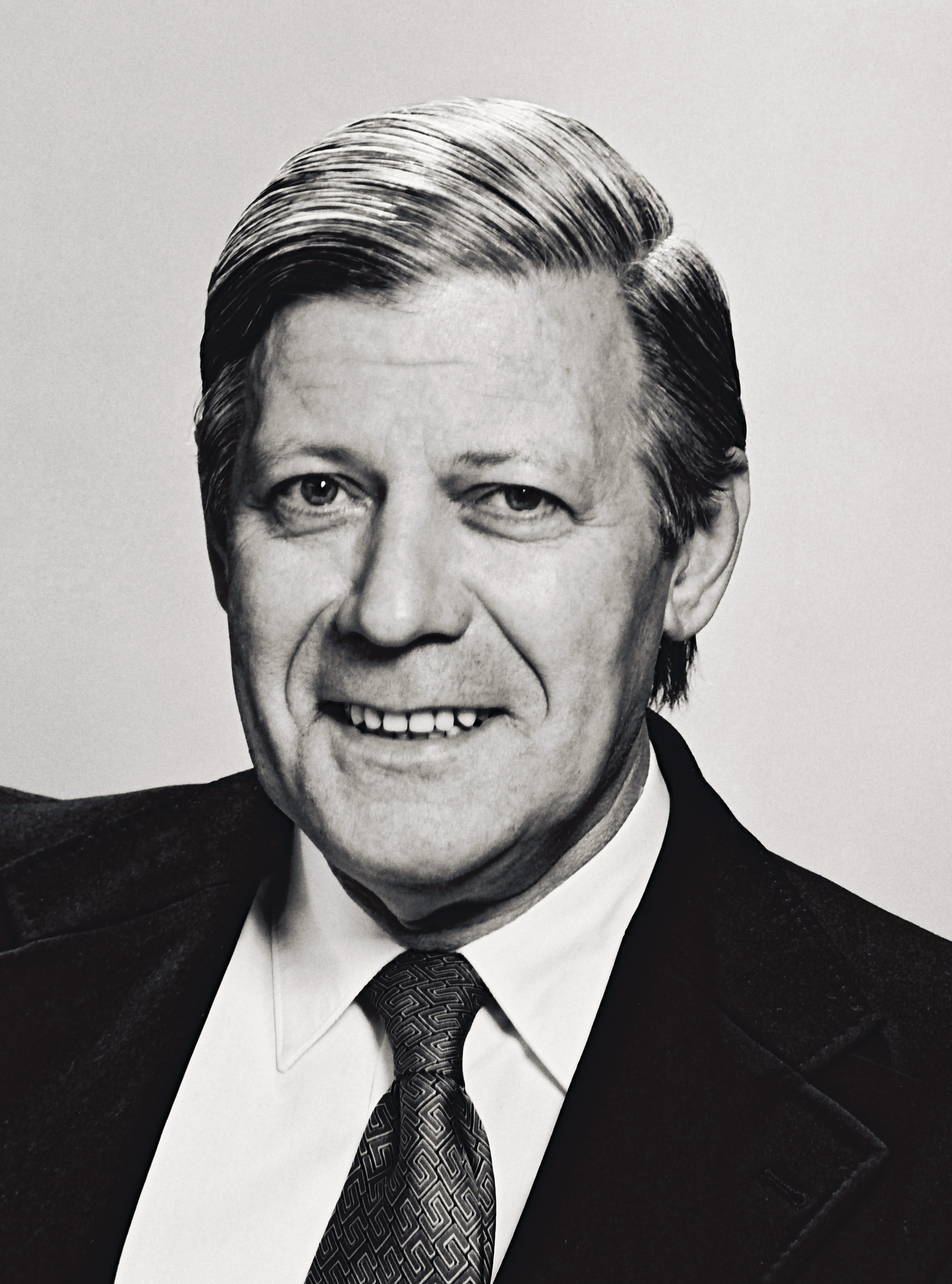
December 15, 1976: West German Chancellor Helmut Schmidt narrowly re-elected by parliament

The following events occurred in December 1976:

== December 1, 1976 (Wednesday) ==
- Angola was admitted as the 146th member of the United Nations. Its initial application had been vetoed by the United States in the UN Security Council because of the continued presence of Cuban troops in the African nation, but the U.S. abstained as the UN General Assembly approved the entry unanimously (116 to 0). Elisio de Figueriredo was the first Angolan ambassador to the UN, serving until 1988.

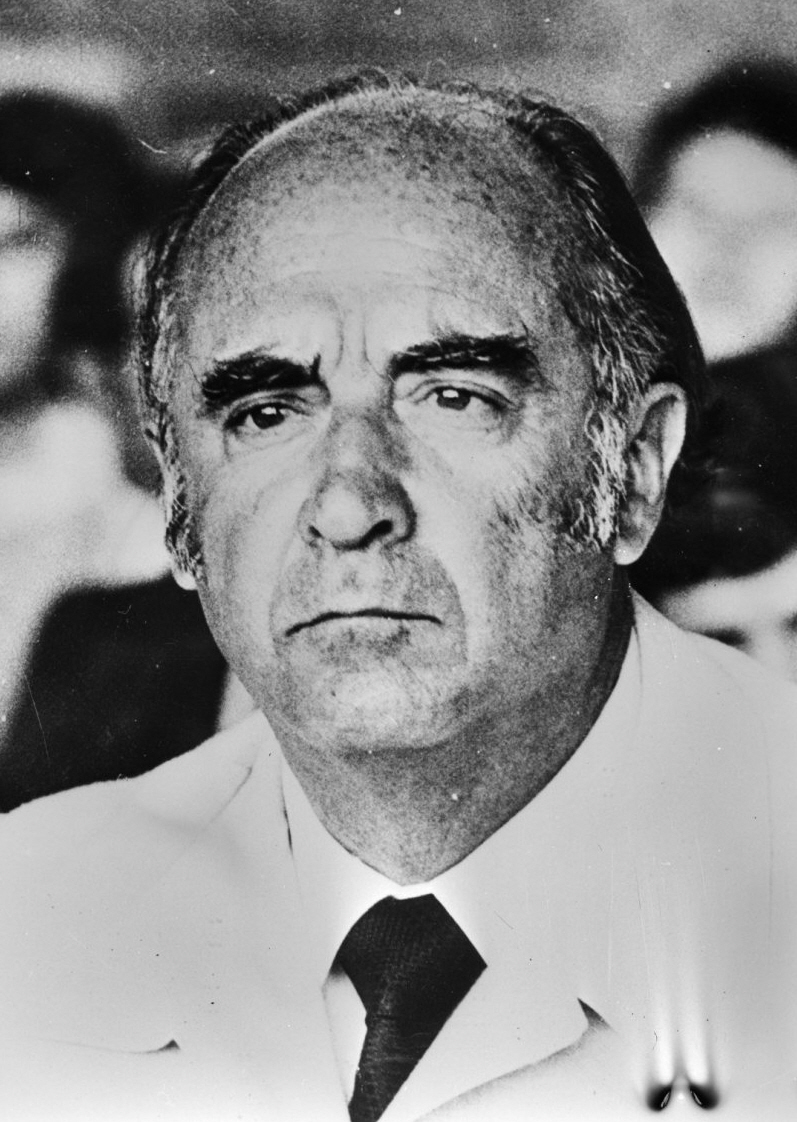
President Lopez

- José López Portillo was sworn into office for a six-year term as President of Mexico.
- The Sex Pistols achieved public notoriety, as guitarist Steve Jones unleashed several "four-letter words" on live television on Bill Grundy's early evening (6:00 pm) show on Thames Television (ITV network), Today, with Grundy's encouragement. Viewers in the London area, the only site to see the live broadcast, flooded the network's telephone switchboard with angry phone calls over "the filthiest language ever used on British television." The uproar propelled the Sex Pistols to widespread fame. Today was cancelled two months later, and Grundy's television career came to an end.
- Sir Douglas Nicholls was appointed the 28th Governor of South Australia as the first Australian Aboriginal executive of an Australian state. Nicholls served less than five months, resigning for reasons of health on April 30, 1977.
- The purchase by the government of Libya of 10 percent ownership of the stock in the Italian automobile manufacturer Fiat was announced by Fiat Chairman of the Board Giovanni Agnelli. The oil exporting North African nation paid Fiat $207 million for 10% of the shares of Fiat stock, as well as investing an additional $208 million for future options.
- The government of Indonesia announced the release of 2,650 Indonesian Communist Party members who had been jailed without trial for 11 years, since an attempted coup d'état in 1965. A spokesman for the government said that 29,000 people remained imprisoned but would be released within three years.
- A terrorist bomb exploded at the officers' club building at the Rhein-Main U.S. Air Force Base in West Germany, destroying the structure and causing minor injuries to nine people who had been dining inside at lunchtime, and nine firemen and a security guard who had responded to the damage.
- The NBC television show C.P.O. Sharkey premiered as a vehicle for comedian Don Rickles, who portrayed a chief petty officer in the U.S. Navy. The show ran for two seasons.
- Born:
  - Matthew Shepard, gay American crime victim whose 1998 torture and murder led to the passage of the first federal "hate crime" legislation; in Casper, Wyoming (d. 1998)
  - Laura Ling, American journalist who was imprisoned in North Korea for five months before her release was secured by former U.S. president Bill Clinton; in Carmichael, California
  - Alya Rohali, Indonesian television host and actress who served as Miss Indonesia in international beauty show competitions from 1996 to 1999; in Jakarta.

== December 2, 1976 (Thursday) ==
- The government of China dismissed Foreign Minister Qiao Guanhua (Chiao Kuan-hua) for collaboration with the Gang of Four, and replaced him with Huang Hua, its Ambassador to the United Nations.
- Esther Norma Arrostito, a leader of the Montoneros Argentine terrorist group who was wanted for the 1970 kidnapping and murder of former president Pedro Aramburu, was captured alive after a gun battle with a patrol of the Army of Argentina, but the Argentine government reported that she had been killed in the crossfire.
- The new constitution of Cuba took effect, eliminating the position of Prime Minister of Cuba (Chairman of the Council of Ministers) and merging it with the office of president (Chairman of the Council of State). Fidel Castro, who had been prime minister, became president, with the job of chairing both councils and succeeding Osvaldo Dorticós Torrado, who had been head of state since Castro took power in 1959. The offices would be separated again in 2019 after the death of Castro. The constitution also created the National Assembly of People's Power (Asamblea Nacional del Poder Popular) as the first parliament since the Congress of Cuba had been abolished 18 years earlier.
- Alexander Zinoviev was expelled from the Communist Party of the Soviet Union after publishing his book Yawning Heights, a satire of the Soviet way of life, in August. Accused of anti-Soviet activity for "extremely cynical slanderous fabrications about Soviet reality, the theory and practice of communist construction, and offensive attacks against Vladimir Lenin, our party and its leadership", Zinoviev was subsequently deprived of his academic titles and privileges.
- Leslie H. "Bud" King, the biological half-brother of incumbent U.S. president Gerald R. Ford, was killed near Lebanon, Tennessee while driving while intoxicated, after he drove his car the wrong way on Interstate Highway 40 and was in a head-on crash with a truck. Ford, whose name at birth had been Leslie Lynch King, Jr., before his adoption, was ten years older than his half-brother, whom he had seen most recently at the 1976 Republican National Convention; both had been sired by Leslie Lynch King, Sr.
- Died:
  - Danny Murtaugh, 59, American baseball coach who managed the Pittsburgh Pirates to two World Series championships.
  - Ramases (stage name for K. Barrington Frost), 42, British psychedelic musician and cult figure
  - Guruvayur Keshavan, 64, Indian elephant who had been a fixture at the Guruvayur Temple in Kerala state for more than 54 years. A statue of the 3.2 m (10 ft) tall elephant is displayed in front of the temple.

== December 3, 1976 (Friday) ==
- Reggae singer Bob Marley, his wife Rita, his manager Don Taylor and Wailers member Lewis Griffiths were shot in an attempted assassination by a man who fired through the window of Marley's mansion in Kingston, Jamaica.
- Patrick Hillery was sworn in after being elected unopposed on November 9, 1976 as the 6th President of Ireland.

== December 4, 1976 (Saturday) ==
- The Central African Republic officially became a monarchy and announced its renaming to the Central African Empire. General Jean-Bedel Bokassa, who had already proclaimed himself "president for life", then converted to Islam and changed his name to Salah Eddine Ahmed Bokassa was now referred to as Emperor Bokassa I.
- South Korea's President Park Chung-hee fired Shin Jik-soo, the director of the Korean Central Intelligence Agency (KCIA) after charges that the KCIA had been intimidating South Korean citizens living abroad, including those in the United States. Park replaced Shin with Lieutenant General Kim Jae-gyu. Kim would later assassinate President Park at a dinner party on October 26, 1979.
- The Association of Evangelical Lutheran Churches was founded at the close of a convention in Chicago by 150 congregations across the U.S. that had left the more conservative Lutheran Church–Missouri Synod because of the policies of its president, the Reverend Jacob A. O. Preus. The new body, representing 75,000 more moderate Lutherans, would exist until 1988 with its merger with two other bodies to form the Evangelical Lutheran Church in America.
- Died:
  - Benjamin Britten, 63, English classical music and opera composer
  - Tommy Bolin, 25, American rock guitarist and songwriter, from an overdose of cocaine

== December 5, 1976 (Sunday) ==
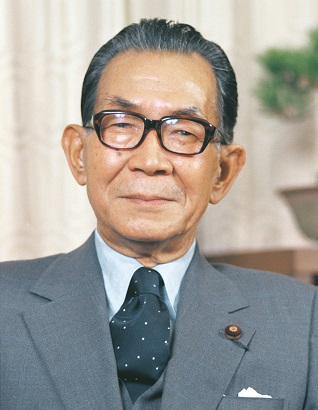
Miki

- Voting took place in Japan for the 511-member House of Representatives (the Shūgiin), with the background of policy split between members of the longtime ruling Liberal Democratic Party (LDP of Jimintō). For the first time in more than 18 years, the LDP lost its majority, falling by 22 seats from 271 members of parliament to 249, less than 50 percent but still the party with the greatest number of seats. Prime Minister Takeo Miki retained his post. The second-place finisher, the Japan Socialist Party had 118 seats, a gain of five, while the remaining opposition was divided among four parties and a group of independent candidates.
- A disgruntled member of the Royal Australian Navy, 19-year-old Able Seaman John Trent, destroyed 12 of the Navy's 13 S-2 antisubmarine patrol airplanes by setting fire to the hangar at the Nowra Naval Air Station south of Sydney. Trent would tell a court-martial panel later that he opened the fuel tanks of two planes, then "got a piece of paper, made an airplane, set it alight and threw it," adding "I really do now know why I did it. I do not know what came over me." Navy men were able to pull five of the twin-engine Grumman submarine-tracker planes from the burning building, but the five aircraft were damaged beyond repair, while the seven inside the hangar were completely destroyed. The Grummans were worth $1,000,000 USD apiece.

== December 6, 1976 (Monday) ==
- The Viet Cong was disbanded, and its former members become a part of the Vietnam People's Army.
- Pieter Menten, a wealthy art dealer from the Netherlands, was arrested at a hotel in Switzerland in the town of Uster, on charges that he was responsible for the Nazi German killing of 120 Jews during the German occupation of Poland in World War II. While being interrogated by Swiss authorities about his past, Menten (who had served eight months imprisonment in the Netherlands in 1950 for collaboration with the Nazis) attempted suicide by swallowing a large dose of sleeping pills. He and his wife had fled from Amsterdam in November when he learned that he was being sought for questioning. The Swiss cabinet authorized the return of Menten to Dutch authorities on December 22.

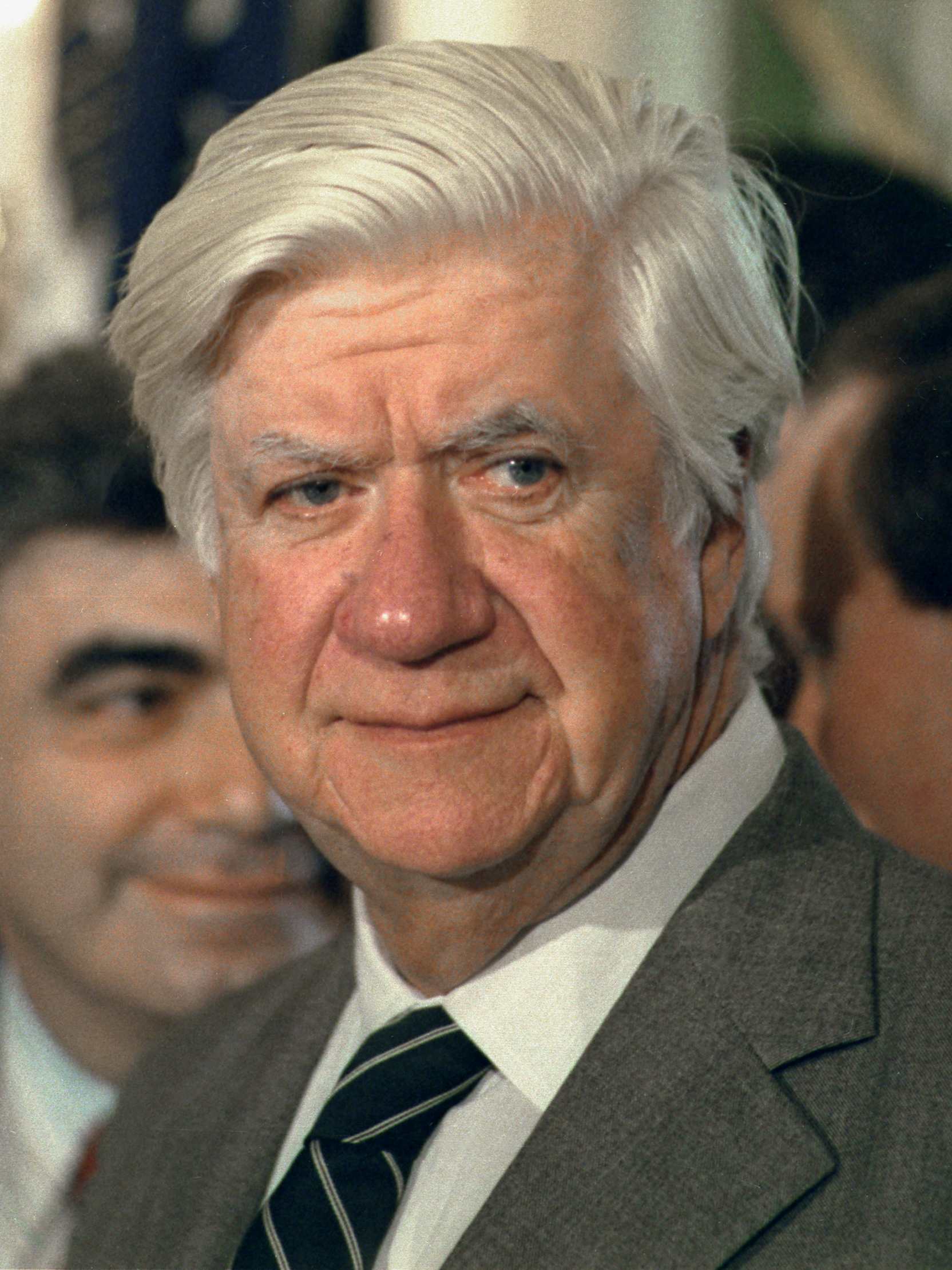
Speaker O'Neill

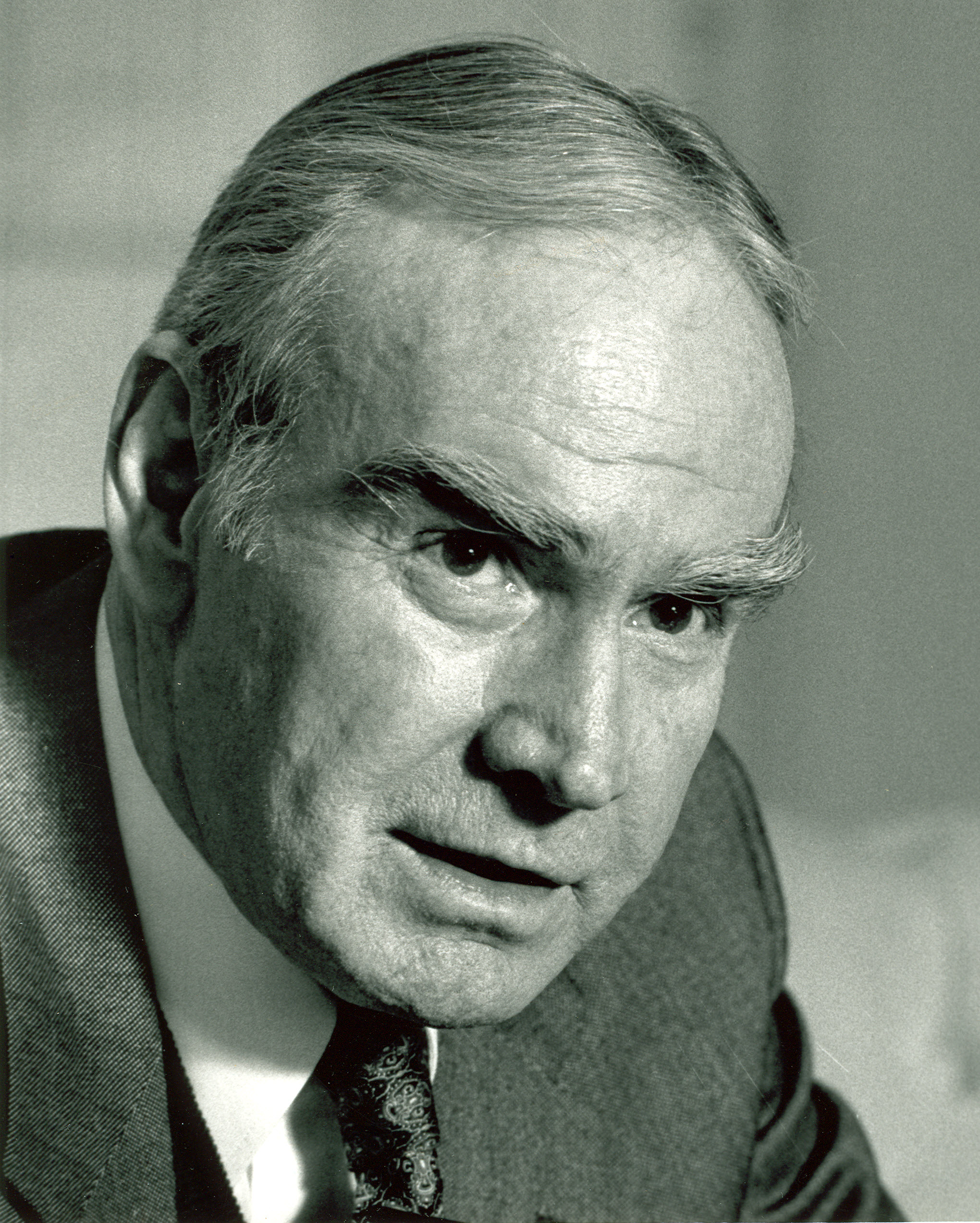
House Majority Leader Wright

- Voting was held by the 292 incoming Democratic Party members of the U.S. House of Representatives (including the four delegates from non-states) for a new Speaker of the House to replace Carl Albert, who had not run for re-election, and for the House Majority Leader. Although the election as Speaker of majority leader Thomas P. "Tip" O'Neill of Massachusetts "was a foregone conclusion", four Congressmen vied to replace O'Neill. Phillip Burton of California, the expected winner, went against Jim Wright of Texas, Richard Bolling of Missouri and John J. McFall of California. With 147 needed for a majority, Burton had 106 votes, Bolling 81 and Wright 77 on the first ballot, while McFall was out after finishing fourth. On the next ballot, Burton had 107, while Wright finished ahead of Bolling by two votes, 95 to 93. On the third and final ballot Wright defeated Burton by a single vote, 148 to 147. Wright would later succeed O'Neill as Speaker in 1987 before resigning amid scandal.
- Born: Alicia Machado, Venezuelan beauty queen and actress who was crowned Miss Universe in 1996; in Maracay
- Died: João Goulart, 58, President of Brazil from 1961 to 1964, from a heart attack

== December 7, 1976 (Tuesday) ==
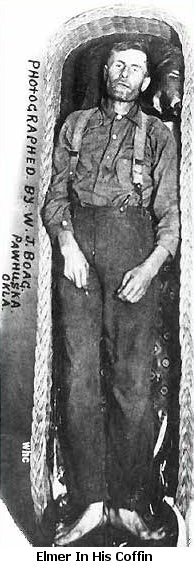
McCurdy, preserved since 1911

- What turned out to be the embalmed body of American bank robber Elmer McCurdy was found at the fun house at The Pike, an amusement park in Long Beach, California, where it had been on display for five years as a mummy "painted with a fluorescent material". A prop man, preparing for the filming of an episode of the TV show The Six Million Dollar Man, had discovered that what appeared to be a dummy was actually a corpse, and the matter had been referred to Dr. Thomas Noguchi, the Los Angeles County coroner, for an autopsy. Three days later, the owner of Entertainment Ventures, Inc., which had formerly owned the body, said that he was aware that the corpse was that of McCurdy and that the petrified body had been sold to a carnival by an Oklahoma City sheriff. On April 13, 1977, Dr. Noguchi's office announced that the body had been confirmed to be that of McCurdy, who had been killed in a gunfight on October 7, 1911, and then spent the next 65 years being displayed at carnival sideshows and at a wax museum.
- Voting was held in the tiny South American nation of Grenada of the 15 seats of the House of Assembly, which was controlled by Prime Minister Eric Gairy's Grenada United Labour Party which had 14 of the 15 seats. An alliance of the three opposition parties (New Jewel Movement, the Grenada National Party and the United People's Party) won six seats and reduced the GULP's majority to 9 to 6, despite fraud and harassment of opposition members by Gairy's private militia, the Volunteer Constables, nicknamed "The Mongoose Gang".
- United Nations Secretary-General Kurt Waldheim was approved for a second five-year term by the UN Security Council, against a challenge by former Mexican President Luis Echeverría Álvarez. Waldheim received 12 of the 15 votes, and Echeverría 3.
- Born: Mark Duplass, American filmmaker, in New Orleans, Louisiana

== December 8, 1976 (Wednesday) ==
- The Congressional Hispanic Caucus was established by the five Latinos in the United States Congress, Herman Badillo of New York, Kika de la Garza and Henry B. Gonzalez of Texas, Edward R. Roybal of California, and the nonvoting Resident Commissioner of Puerto Rico, Baltasar Corrada del Río.
- Hotel California, which would become one of the best-selling record albums of all times, was released by Asylum Records after being recorded by the Eagles. In addition to the title track, the album included "New Kid in Town", and "Life in the Fast Lane."
- Born:
  - Dominic Monaghan, British film and TV actor, later producer of the BBC series Wild Things with Dominic Monaghan; to British parents stationed in West Berlin in West Germany
  - Zoe Konstantopoulou, Greek politician and Speaker of the Hellenic Parliament in 2015; in Athens

== December 9, 1976 (Thursday) ==
- The Aboriginal Land Rights Act 1976, the first Australian law that legally recognized the Aboriginal system of land ownership, and legislated the concept of inalienable freehold title, was passed by Parliament.
- Afghanistan Army General Mir Ahmad Shah Rizwani was arrested after the failure of an attempted coup d'état against President Mohammed Daoud Khan. After Daoud's overthrow, Rizwani would be executed in 1978 by the new Communist government.
- The African Regional Intellectual Property Organization (ARIPO) was established by the Lusaka Agreement (officially the Agreement on the Creation of the Industrial Property Organization for English-speaking Africa), signed in the capital of Zambia by representatives of 13 nations.
- The Argentine financial newspaper Ámbito Financiero was founded by Julio Ramos and the Honduran daily newspaper La Tribuna was founded the same day in Tegucigalpa, the capital of Honduras.
- Born: Bae Soo-bin, South Korean actor known for the SBS drama Temptation of an Angel and the film Mai Ratima; in Seoul

== December 10, 1976 (Friday) ==
- The Nobel Prizes for 1976 were presented to the recipients in Stockholm by King Carl XVI Gustaf for Sweden, with an unusual award in which all five of the prizes were awarded to Americans, marking the first time since the prizes were first awarded in 1901 that citizens of one country received all the prizes. The winners were Baruch Blumberg and D. Carleton Gajdusek (Physiology or Medicine), Samuel C. C. Ting and Burton Richter (Physics), William N. Lipscomb (Chemistry) Milton Friedman (Economics), and Saul Bellow (Literature). The Nobel Peace Prize was not awarded.
- The United Nations General Assembly adopted the Convention on the Prohibition of Military or Any Other Hostile Use of Environmental Modification Techniques.
- In a yes/no election in Algeria, voters overwhelmingly approved the re-election of Houari Boumediene to a new six-year term. The vote, with no choice of candidates, was the first in 13 years and had a reported turnout of 96 percent of eligible citizens.

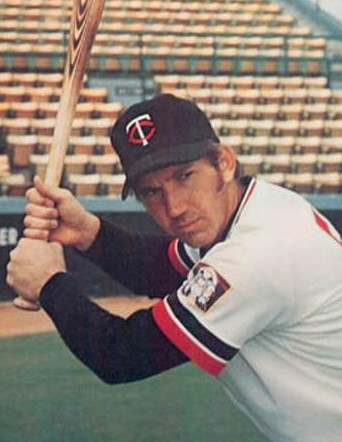
Thompson

- Died: Danny Thompson, 29, American major league baseball player who played for three seasons after being diagnosed with leukemia. Thompson had played 98 games during the 1976 season for the Texas Rangers, and died a little more than two months after his final game on October 2, when he was used as a pinch hitter.

== December 11, 1976 (Saturday) ==
- Ferdinand Marcos, President of the Philippines, said in an address that he intended to require the United States to pay rent to the Philippine government for all U.S. military bases in the Asian nation. The U.S. had agreed a week earlier to provide one billion dollars in foreign aid in exchange for the right to maintain the bases, but Marcos rejected the offer.
- Antonio María de Oriol, the former chairman of the Spanish Council of State since 1973, and a former Minister of Justice, was kidnapped from his Madrid office by Marxist–Leninist terrorists who were members of Grupos de Resistencia Antifascista Primero de Octubre (GRAPO) and held for ransom, four days before the scheduled referendum for political reform. Oriol would be rescued on February 11 in a raid by Spanish security forces.
- Marc-André Bédard, the provincial Minister of Justice for the Canadian province of Quebec announced that he would dismiss all charges against Dr. Henry Morgentaler, who had refused to comply with Canada's criminal law regarding abortion, which allowed pre-natal termination of pregnancy but only if a three-member "therapeutic abortion committee" approved the abortion. Morgentaler, who performed abortions at his private clinic regardless of approval, had been tried and acquitted three times, and was awaiting a fourth trial when Bedard determined that the abortion law was effectively unenforceable. Morgentaler later brought a suit which would result in a 1988 Supreme Court of Canada decision, R v Morgentaler, finding the law unconstitutional.
- Turkey and Greece reopened the hotline between the two nations' tactical air commands, more than two years after cutting off service during the Turkish invasion of Cyprus in 1974.
- Thirteen people in Argentina, riding in the back of a truck while returning from a wedding reception, were killed when the driver attempted to cross ahead of an oncoming train.
- Died: Elmyr de Hory, 70, Hungarian-born painter and master at art forgery, committed suicide with an overdose of barbiturates. He was later profiled by Clifford Irving (who had attempted to publish a fake autobiography of Howard Hughes) in the biography Fake! The Story of Elmyr de Hory the Greatest Art Forger of Our Time.

== December 12, 1976 (Sunday) ==
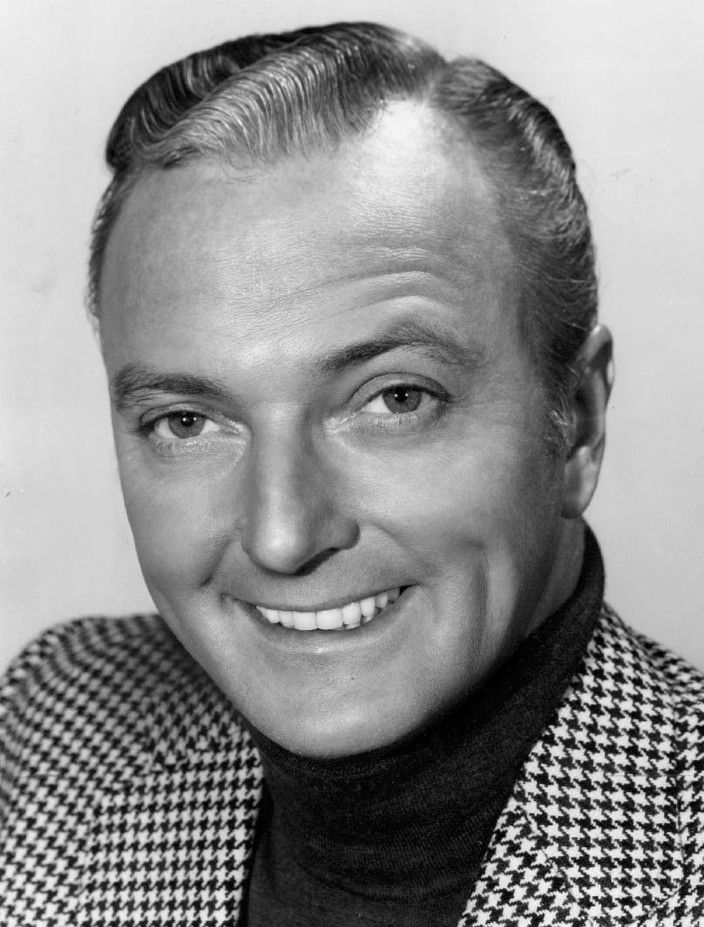
Jack Cassidy

- Walter Stolle of West Germany completed the longest bicycle tour on record, almost 18 years after beginning on January 24, 1959. During that time, Stolle had ridden more than 402,000 miles (647,000 km) in 159 countries.
- Died: Jack Cassidy, 49, American singer and stage and television actor, died in a fire at his apartment in West Hollywood, California, after falling asleep while smoking a cigarette.

== December 13, 1976 (Monday) ==
- A unit of the Army of Argentina carried out the torture and execution of 22 guerrillas who were suspected members of the Montoneros. The killing took place outside of the town of Margarita Belén in the Chaco Province, with provincial police assisting.

== December 14, 1976 (Tuesday) ==
- The first Congress of the ruling Vietnamese Workers Party since 1960 opened in Hanoi, with Le Duan, the General Secretary of the Party and the de facto leader of the Communist nation, delivered a six-hour address, outlining plans to reach out to the West from the Communist nation for foreign trade and investment, and to rebuild both the former South Vietnam and North Vietnam after damage from the Vietnam War. The Party approved a five-year plan to transform the defeated former South Vietnam "into a vast rice bowl" with more than one million people to be forcibly resettled from the former Saigon to "new economic zones" and conversion of large sections of urban property into farmland. At the close of the congress, the delegates approved a plan to call the organization the Vietnamese Communist Party.
- The members of the United States Electoral College, who had been selected in the 1976 United States presidential election, met in their individual state capitals to formally cast their electoral votes. One "faithless elector" from the state of Washington pledged to the Republican Party, Mike Padden of Spokane, cast a protest vote for former California Governor Ronald Reagan in order to call attention to the issue of abortion. The final result was Jimmy Carter 297 votes, Gerald Ford 240, and Reagan 1.
- Evangelos Mallios, formerly the director of Greece's security police during the military rule of the European nation, was shot to death outside his home by two members of the terrorist group 17N. Mallios had been convicted of torturing political prisoners who had opposed the regime of George Papadopoulos during the dictatorship .

== December 15, 1976 (Wednesday) ==
- Voters in a referendum in Spain elected overwhelmingly to ratify the Political Reform Law, allowing democratic elections and the drafting of a new constitution that would provide freedoms that had not existed in Spain for more than 40 years since the Spanish Civil War.
- Helmut Schmidt narrowly won re-election as Chancellor of West Germany within the 496-member Bundestag, barely receiving the majority of at least 249 votes of approval from legislators. Schmidt had 250 in his favor from his coalition of his own 214 Social Democrats (SPD) and the 39 Free Democrats, and all 243 of the CDU/CSU voted against him. One SPD member abstained, the ballot of another was declared invalid and another legislator was unable to attend the session because of illness.
- Voting in Jamaica for the 60-seat House of Representatives resulted in an increase in the large majority of Prime Minister Michael Manley's People's National Party (PNP), which won 47 seats. With the addition of seven seats to the House, the PNP went from a 37 to 16 lead to a 47 to 13 majority over the rival Jamaica Labour Party.
- The Kingdom of Western Samoa (now referred to as Samoa) became the 147th member state of the United Nations.
- Denis Healey, the Chancellor of the Exchequer, announced to the British Parliament that he had successfully negotiated a loan of 2.3 billion pounds (or 3.9 billion dollars) for the United Kingdom from the International Monetary Fund, in return for a reduction of government spending and the sale of shares of government-owned stock in the British Petroleum company (now BP).
- The Montoneros terrorist group in Argentina infiltrated Argentine Defense Ministry headquarters in Buenos Aires and planted a bomb in a lecture hall that killed 11 people, including Air Force Major General Angel Luchessi and injured 23 others.
- More than 230 people were injured in Syria, and three were killed, when a time bomb inside a suitcase exploded in the baggage claim area at the airport in Baghdad. The suitcase had been placed on an Egyptair flight from Damascus in Syria, and had apparently been set to destroy the airliner in midair, but the jet had arrived in Baghdad 30 minutes ahead of schedule.
- Died: Grégoire Kayibanda, 52, the first President of Rwanda, died in detention three years after being overthrown in a coup d'etat in 1973.

== December 16, 1976 (Thursday) ==
- The Center for Disease Control (CDC) of the United States announced that it was suspending the nationwide immunization program against swine flu after reports from 14 states of a total of 51 recent cases (four of them fatal) of Guillain–Barré syndrome in people who had received the shots only three weeks earlier. Another 31 cases were found in people who had not been vaccinated, and the status of 12 others could not be established. A subsequent investigation found 223 cases of paralysis nationwide from Guillain-Barre.
- Three masked burglars broke into the Louvre museum in Paris, reaching the second floor by climbing a scaffold left by maintenance workers and stole the diamond-studded coronation sword of King Charles X of France, made in 1824. The sword had 1,576 white diamonds, which were presumably removed from the artifact and resold. Although other stolen items have been recovered, the coronation sword was still missing as of 2021.
- The Bank of America announced that its U.S. credit card, the BankAmericard, would change its name to the VISA card in a 32-month process to start on March 1, 1977, with a worldwide advertising program to begin on February 15. At the time, the Bank's subsidiaries, National BankAmericard Inc. and Ibanco had a "somewhat confusing array of blue-white-and-gold cards issued under different names in 22 countries around the world," (including Chargex in Canada, Carte Bleue in France, and Barclaycard in the UK). The change was made to create a name recognized universally regardless of language.

== December 17, 1976 (Friday) ==
- An independent UHF television station in the U.S. city of Atlanta, Georgia, WTCG Channel 17, owned by Ted Turner, became the world's first "superstation" as its broadcasts were uplinked to the Satcom 1 communications satellite and received and telecast by four cable TV systems in the United States. At 1:00 in the afternoon Eastern time (12:00 noon Central), cable TV customers saw the film Deep Waters, and local Atlanta commercials, in Grand Island, Nebraska; Newport News, Virginia; Troy, Alabama; and Newton, Kansas, with identification as the "Turner Broadcasting System" (TBS).
- Takeo Miki, the prime minister of Japan, announced his resignation in the wake of the Liberal Democratic Party's loss of a majority in the December 5 elections.

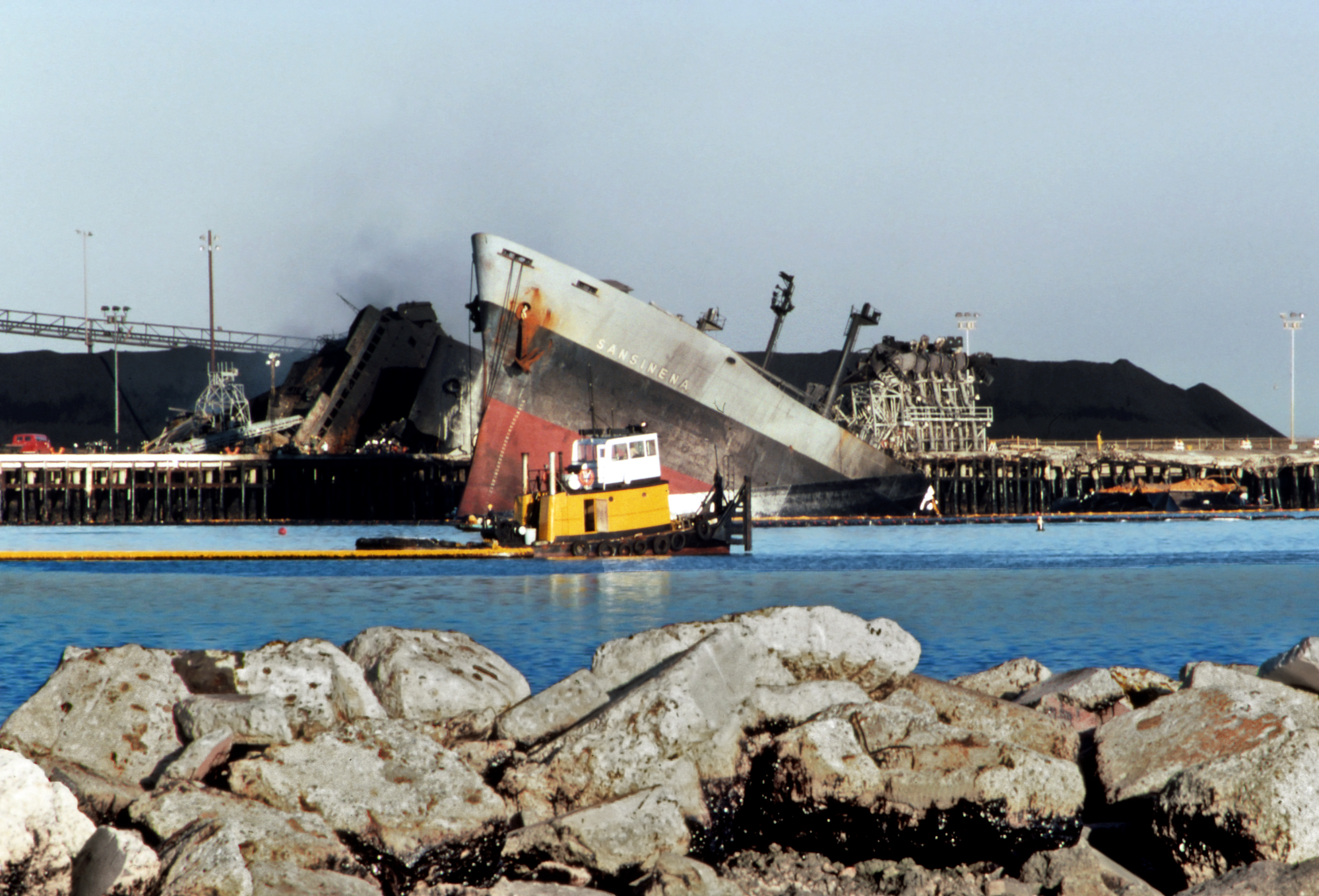
The wreckage of SS Sansinema required attribution: Ted Quackenbush

- In the Port of Los Angeles at San Pedro, California, the Italian-manned oil tanker SS Sansinena exploded at 7:40 in the evening, killing nine people and injuring 46 others.
- Produced by Dino De Laurentiis, the first remake of the classic 1933 film King Kong was released in theaters, starring Jeff Bridges, and Jessica Lange in her debut role.

== December 18, 1976 (Saturday) ==
- The Forty-second Amendment of the Constitution of India, authorizing dictatorial powers to the national government led by Prime Minister Indira Gandhi, was signed into law by President Fakhruddin Ali Ahmed, after having been ratified by more than half of India's 22 states, to go into effect on January 3, 1977. The new rules gave the Indian Parliament authority to amend the Constitution without requiring ratification, as well as prohibiting the Indian courts from reviewing any amendments and requiring a two-thirds majority to repeal existing laws.
- The Soviet Union and Chile made an exchange of political prisoners after the U.S. served as an intermediary. Soviet dissident Vladimir Bukovsky, who had been imprisoned for almost six years after his arrest on March 29, 1971, was flown to Switzerland. At the same time, Chile released Luis Corvalán, the General Secretary of the Chilean Communist Party and both men were set free at the airport in Zürich. The exchange was "the first involving political prisoners in the history of East‐West relations," as opposed to previous exchanges of captured spies who had been convicted of espionage.

== December 19, 1976 (Sunday) ==
- An airplane crashed into the upper stands of Memorial Stadium in Baltimore at 5:05 in the afternoon, only six minutes after an NFL playoff game that the Pittsburgh Steelers had won, 40 to 14, over the Baltimore Colts. The pilot, Donald Kroner, had posted bail after having been arrested five days earlier on a charge of reckless flying and making a threat against former Colts player Bill Pellington. Three policemen and the pilot were injured when the single-engine Piper Cherokee struck Section 41 of the stadium, but most of the crowd of 60,000 had left early because of the lopsided loss for the Colts. Kroner would be convicted of malicious destruction of property and reckless flying in February, later sentenced to two years in prison, and paroled in July on condition that he receive counseling.
- Guerrillas of the Zimbabwe African National Liberation Army (ZANLA) attacked a group of black Rhodesian workers at a tea plantation outside the village of Melsetter (now Chimanimani) near the border with Mozambique and killed 27 of them. The murders, by machine gun and bayonet, were carried out after the workers refused to quit their jobs in protest, as demanded by the guerrillas. Eleven of the 38 men escaped death by hiding under the corpses of the people killed.
- For the first time, women were selected as Rhodes Scholars, almost 75 years after the scholarship for academically successful student athletes had been established by the will of Cecil Rhodes.

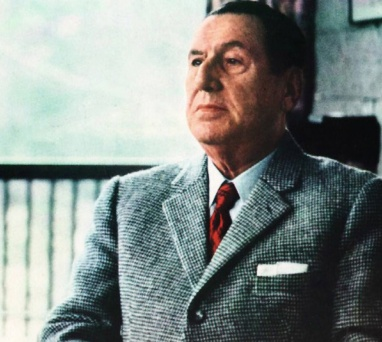
Peron

- The body of former president of Argentina Juan Perón, kept in a crypt on the grounds of the Casa Rosada, the official presidential residence since shortly after his death on July 1, 1974, was given a burial as the military government that had overthrown his wife took his coffin to the cemetery at the Chacarita section of Buenos Aires. On October 22, the military had removed the body of former First Lady Eva Perón from the Casa Rosada and placed it in a family mausoleum in another cemetery. President Jorge Rafael Videla had avoided the Casa Rosada because of the presence of the two bodies.

== December 20, 1976 (Monday) ==
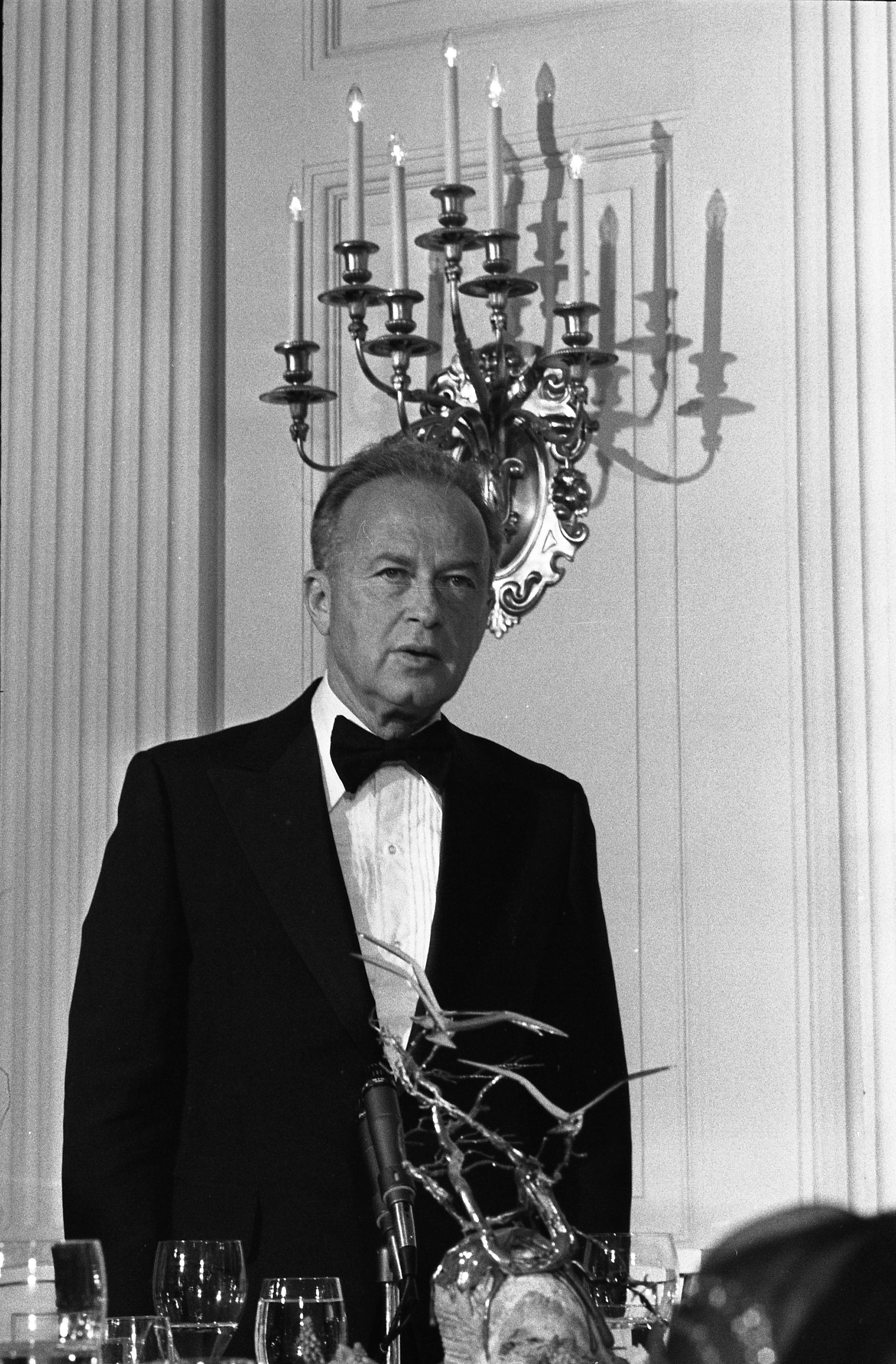
Prime Minister Rabin

- Israel's Prime Minister Yitzhak Rabin announced his resignation, dissolved the Israeli Parliament (the Knesset) and called for new elections. Rabin had ended his government by expelling cabinet members from the National Religious Party, who had abstained rather than voting against the motion of no confidence. Rabin said that he would lead a caretaker government until voting could take place in May or June. The elections, originally scheduled for November, would take place on May 17, 1977.

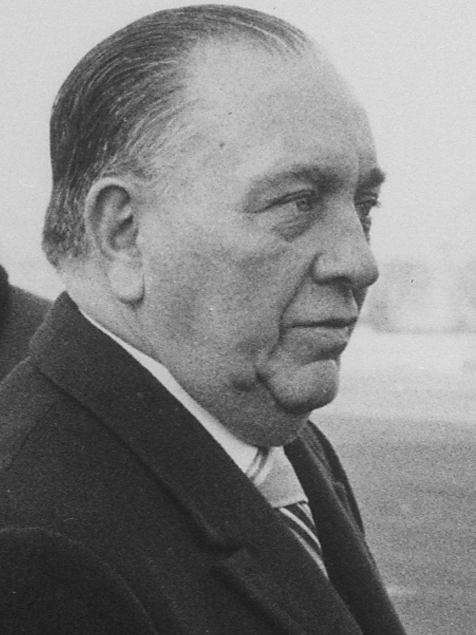
Mayor Daley

- Richard J. Daley, 76, Mayor of Chicago and political boss for 21 years, died of a sudden heart attack while at the office of his personal physician after suffering chest pains. After hosting a Christmas breakfast for city officials, working in his office, and attending the dedication of a new gymnasium, Daley was in the office of Dr. Thomas J. Coogan when he was stricken. Dr. Coogan had been arranging to send the mayor to the Northwestern Memorial Hospital, and was unable to revive Daley. Because of a dispute between Wilson Frost, president pro tempore of the City Council, and Kenneth Sain, the Deputy Mayor over who could act as the temporary mayor, the 48-member Council elected Michael Bilandic as Acting Mayor of Chicago on December 28.
- Elections were held for the 70-seat National Assembly of the nation of Mauritius for the first time since the nation became independent in 1968. The Independence Party (with 28 seats and led by Prime Minister Seewoosagur Ramgoolam) and the Mauritian Social Democrat Party (6) were able to form a coalition government with 36 seats for a majority, while the new Mauritian Militant Movement had 34. None of the other 31 parties won more than three percent of the vote.
- Pope Paul VI announced that a consistory of cardinals had formally approved the canonization of Bishop John Neumann as the first American man to become a saint in the Roman Catholic Church, with the ceremony to take place on June 19, 1977. Neumann was the third American saint overall, after Frances Cabrini and Mother Seton.
- The use of the Catalan language in the four provinces of Spain in the Catalonia region was approved by the Spanish government. Prime Minister Adolfo Suárez announced that the regional government officials in the provinces of Barcelona, Girona, Lleida, and Tarragona could use Catalan equally with Spanish and declared that "The Government understands that bilingualism in Spanish and Catalan, which is normal in family, social and cultural life, can also be normal in official life," marking a change in policy from the 40-year rule of Francisco Franco, who prohibited the official use of Catalan.
- Born: Jang Hyuk (stage name for Jeong Yong-jun), South Korean TV and film actor, rap music artist; in Busan
- Died:
  - Ned Washington, 75, American songwriter known for the lyrics to "When You Wish Upon a Star" and the theme from the TV show Rawhide
  - Stella Court Treatt, 81, South African filmmaker, author, and adventurer

== December 21, 1976 (Tuesday) ==
- A major oil spill was caused by the breaking apart of the Liberian-registered oil tanker MV Argo Merchant, which had run aground on the Nantucket Shoals off of the coast of the U.S. state of Rhode Island on December 15. While the crew was evacuated, the shallow waters and weather conditions made it impossible to offload the oil and when the tanker ship fell apart, its entire cargo of 7.7 million U.S. gallons (29 million liters) of fuel oil was emptied into the sea. Fortunately, winds from the northwest blew the oil slick away from the coast and the oil dissipated.
- Rubin "Hurricane" Carter and John Artis, who had both been convicted of a 1966 murder and then won the right to a retrial because of prosecutor misconduct in 1967, were convicted a second time on three counts of first degree murder. In 1985, a federal court would set aside the convictions and Carter and Artis would be set free.
- "Women Artists: 1550–1950", the first international art exhibition made up entirely of art created by professional female artists, began an 11-month tour of six art museums, opening in the Los Angeles County Museum of Art with works from 83 female artists from 12 nations.
- Born: Mirela Maniani, Albanian-born Greek track athlete, 1999 and 2003 world champion in the women's javelin competition; in Durrës
- Died:
  - Munro Leaf (pen name for Wilbur Monroe Leaf), 71, American children's book writer known for the popular 1936 work The Story of Ferdinand, which created the character of "Ferdinand the Bull"
  - Emil Savundra, 53, Sri Lankan-born British con man who founded Fire, Auto and Marine Insurance Company and profited from its collapse

== December 22, 1976 (Wednesday) ==
- Edwin Moore II, a retired employee of the Central Intelligence Agency (CIA) was arrested and charged in federal court with unauthorized possession of defense-related materials and theft of U.S. government property, after being seen leaving a package of classified documents at the residence of a Soviet resident of Washington, along with a note promising to supply more documents for $200,000. Fearing that a bomb had been left on his home, the Soviet man called the police, who traced the package— photocopies of a directory of CIA agents— to Moore. Although initially given a life sentence, Moore would have his penalty reduced to 15 years.
- The Ilyushin Il-86 wide body jet airliner (or airbus), comparable to the American DC-10, made its first flight.
- Died:
  - Colin Leslie Hewett, 67, British biochemist who created a process for the synthesis of estrogen and for testosterone
  - Mikio Mizuta, 71, former Finance Minister of Japan and founder of Josai University
  - Sir Richard Aluwihare, Sri Lankan government official, former Inspector General of Police and minister to India

== December 23, 1976 (Thursday) ==
- The Egyptian passenger ship MV Patra, with 387 passengers and 94 crew aboard, sank in the Red Sea. While 341 were rescued, the other 140 were missing and presumed to have gone down with the ship, which was sailing from the Saudi Arabian port of Jeddah toward Suez. The sinking occurred after a fire broke out in the engine room and passengers were advised to jump into the sea. An hour later, a series of explosions was followed by the ship going down.

The Moro Muslim area (in blue)

- The "Tripoli Agreement" between the Government of the Philippines and the Moro National Liberation Front was signed in the capital of Libya, though never ratified, with the intent of establishing an autonomous region on the island of Mindanao for Muslims in 13 provinces, including Basilan, Palawan and Sulu, with limited self-government. The plan failed because of the decision by President Ferdinand Marcos to require a referendum in each province affected in each area that was to be included in the autonomous region. Most of the regions did not have a Muslim majority.
- A new volcano, Murara, erupted in eastern Zaire. a small, short-lived, cinder cone on the flank of Mount Nyamuragira. At its highest, on January 18, the cone was measured as 150 metres (490 ft).
- The codice fiscale, a 16-character identification passcode of letters and number, was implemented in Italy for all citizens for purposes of tax returns. The code is similar to a social security number in the United States or the national insurance number issued in the United Kingdom.
- General elections were held in Singapore for the 69 seat parliament. The People's Action Party, led by Prime Minister Lee Kwan Yew, won all 69 constituencies; the Workers' Party received 11 percent of the vote overall.

== December 24, 1976 (Friday) ==
- Takeo Fukuda was narrowly elected as the new prime minister of Japan by the two houses of Japan's Parliament, the National Diet. After being unanimously picked by the Liberal Democratic Party members to succeed Takeo Miki (who had resigned after the LDP lost its absolute majority) as LDP leader, Fukuda only barely got a majority, receiving 256 out of 508 votes cast in the House of Representatives, while 10 ballots were left blank as a protest, and Tomomi Narita got 122. In the House of Councillors he got 125 of the 246 votes.
- Prince Jean de Broglie, Foreign Minister of France from 1966 to 1967, was murdered by a gunman who shot him three times. The killing was traced to his financial advisor and was determined to have been motivated by greed, rather than a political assassination. The arrests of six people, including Broglie's two business partners, Pierre de Varga and Patrick de Ribemont, was made on December 29. A private detective, Guy Simonet, had arranged the murder and then attempted to blame it on a right-wing organization, the Club Charles Martel.
- India's Gujarat state was released from President's rule, which had been imposed on March 12 and the ruling Congress Party appointed a new Chief Minister and state government. Only two of India's 22 states, Tamil Nadu and Orissa, remained under president's rule.
- The government of Thailand issued an amnesty declaration forgiving all persons involved in the October 6 coup and the subsequent massacre of student protesters at Thammasat University.
- Died: Duarte Nuno, Duke of Braganza, 69, pretender to the throne of Portugal since the death in 1932 of the former King Manuel II, the last king before the monarchy was abolished in 1910.

== December 25, 1976 (Saturday) ==
- EgyptAir Flight 864 crashed into an industrial complex in Bangkok on its arrival from Mumbai, killing all 52 people on board and 19 in a textile factory. The Boeing 707 was on a multi-stop flight that had originated in Rome with a final scheduled destination of Tokyo.
- Born:
  - Armin van Buuren, Dutch DJ and host of the weekly radio show A State of Trance (ASOT), broadcast worldwide; in Leiden
  - Karin Amatmoekrim, Surinamese novelist; in Paramaribo

== December 26, 1976 (Sunday) ==
- Twenty-two residents of Chafe's Rest Home, a nursing home in the Canadian town of Goulds, Newfoundland were killed in a fire.
- Larry Kenon of the San Antonio Spurs set an NBA record that still stands, with 11 steals in one game, a 110 to 105 win over the Kansas City Kings. The record would be tied by Kendall Gill of the New Jersey Nets on April 3, 1999, but has not been broken.
- Died:
  - U.S. senator Philip Hart, 64, "The Conscience of the Senate" who had represented Michigan since 1959, died of cancer. The Hart Senate Office Building would be named in his honor.
  - Soviet Air Force Lieutenant General Leonid I. Beda, 56, Soviet Union war hero, was killed in an auto accident
  - Saiful Bahri, 52, Indonesian composer

== December 27, 1976 (Monday) ==
- The government of the Soviet Union announced that the ruling Communist Party and the government-controlled trade unions had approved a plan to increase the wages of one-third of the nation's work force by 28 percent over a five-year period, affecting 31 million people including teachers, nurses, store employees and social workers. The first raises took effect in February for workers in the remote areas of the USSR in the north near the Arctic Circle and in the far eastern parts of the country.
- Died: Main Bocher, 86, American fashion designer who founded the Mainbocher clothing label in 1929 and pioneered dress innovations in the 1930s such as the strapless evening gown and short evening dresses.

== December 28, 1976 (Tuesday) ==
- The first local government elections in the history of Nigeria took place across the nation, the most populous in Africa, as voters selected members of "local councils". The creation of elections of local officials, rather than appointment, was the first reform implemented by the President, Lieutenant General Olusegun Obasanjo to give Nigeria's 60 million citizens a closer connection to the government and a promise to return to civilian rule by 1979.
- Albania promulgated a new constitution declaring the Balkan nation to be the People's Socialist Republic of Albania.
- Born: Deodatus "Deddy" Corbuzier, Indonesian magician; in Jakarta
- Died:
  - Freddie King, 42, American blues guitarist, from acute pancreatitis
  - Richard Honeck, 97, American murderer who spent 64 years in jail for an 1899 killing until being paroled in 1963
  - Kim Dae-doo, 27, South Korean serial killer who murdered 17 people in 1975, was hanged at Seodaemun Prison in Seoul

== December 29, 1976 (Wednesday) ==
- South Africa's white police force completed the release of 102 black activists who had been imprisoned since August, without being charged, under the nation's Internal Security Act. The first group had been freed on December 20. More than 300 remained incarcerated.

== December 30, 1976 (Thursday) ==
- All 38 crew of the Taiwanese oil tanker SS Grand Zenith were killed when the ship sank off of the coast of Cape Sable in the Canadian province of Nova Scotia.
- Pakistan State Oil, the government-owned petroleum producing company, was created by the merger of State Oil Company Limited and Premier Oil Company Limited (which had been created by merging Pakistan National Oil and Dawood Petroleum Limited).
- Spain's Court of Public Order, which had tried and convicted hundreds of opponents of President Francisco Franco since 1936, was abolished by the new Spanish government and democratic reforms continued.
- Bert Jones of the Baltimore Colts was named the Associated Press NFL Most Valuable Player. The Pittsburgh Steelers' Jack Lambert finished second and the Oakland Raiders' Ken Stabler finished third.
- Died: Sergei Ogoltsov, 76, disgraced former First Deputy Minister of State Security of the Soviet Union. Ogoltsov had been removed from office in 1954 and stripped of his rank and medals in 1959.

== December 31, 1976 (Friday) ==
- Less than three weeks before the expiration of his term, U.S. president Gerald Ford issued a statement calling for the Commonwealth of Puerto Rico to be admitted as the 51st state of the United States. His statement marked the first time a U.S. president had appealed for statehood for Puerto Rico, which had been a U.S. territory since 1898. Ford said in his statement "I will recommend to the 95th Congress the enactment of legislation providing for the admission of Puerto Rico as a state of the Union. The common bonds of friendship, tradition, dignity, and individual freedom have joined the people of the United States and the people of Puerto Rico. It is now time to make these bonds permanent through statehood, in accordance with the concept of mutual acceptance which has historically governed the relationship between Puerto Rico and the United States."
- The celebration of the United States bicentennial came to an end with the last admission of a visitor to the American Freedom Train that had been going from one U.S. city to the next since April 1, 1975, closing out at Miami
- The very last of the Bicentennial Minutes that had been a regular feature on the CBS television in the United States since July 4, 1974. President Ford recorded the final Bicentennial Minute.
- Died: Judith Westphalen, 54, Peruvian artist
