= Colin Leslie Hewett =

British biochemist

Dr Colin Leslie Hewett FRSE FRIC (1909–1976) was a British biochemist and co-discoverer of an artificial equivalent of both oestrogen and testosterone.

== Life ==
He was born on 19 August 1909 in London and educated at Dulwich College. He studied Science at the University of London graduating BSc in 1932 and gaining a doctorate (PhD) in 1934. During the Second World War he worked for the Ministry of Supply and on Chemical Defence research based variously at Sutton Oak and Porton Down.

From 1944 until retiral in 1974 he worked for Organon Laboratories Ltd, serving as Research Director from 1955.

In 1962 he was elected a Fellow of the Royal Society of Edinburgh for his numerous discoveries. His proposers were Patrick Dunbar Ritchie, James Norman Davidson, Guy Frederic Marrian, Ralph Raphael, John Monteath Robertson, and Sir William Weipers.

He died in Glasgow on 22 December 1976.
