= Mandla Hlatshwayo =

South African actor (1976-2017)

- Born: Mandla Hlatshwayo; 24 November 1976; Soweto, South Africa
- Died: 14 May 2017 (aged 40); Pimville, South Africa
- Occupation(s): Actor, Television and radio presenter
- Years active: 1995–2017
- Spouse: Amanda Mabuso
- Children: 5

Mandla Hlatshwayo (24 November 1976 – 14 May 2017) was a South African actor and media personality. He is best known for the roles in the television serials such as; The Lab, Generations and Backstage.

== Personal life ==
Hlatshwayo was born on 24 November 1976 in Soweto, Chiawelo, South Africa. He had one sister, Maggie Ntombela and a brother, Sipho. His father was also killed some years ago during a robbery.

He was married to Amanda Mabuso and was a father of five children. However after the death of Hlatshwayo, the rift between his estranged wife Amanda and girlfriend Mami rose up. Meanwhile, a 25 old girl Kombi Ngubane from Protea North in Soweto revealed that she had a connection with Hlatshwayo and gave a birth to a child by him.

== Career ==
In the mid-1990s, he joined with the Chiawela Community Theatre Group and performed in many stage plays. He started his television career in 1996 after he joined the SABC1 serial Soul City 2. In 1998 he joined and worked for an industrial theatre company called "Blue Moon". In the same year, he appeared in the serials Deafening Silence and Kelebone. In 1999, he joined the cast of popular SABC1 soap opera Generations. In the soap, he played the role of "Siphiwe Phosa". The role became very popular, where he continued to play the role for seven consecutive years until 2006. In the meantime, he also presented the youth magazine program "Electric Workshop" on SABC2.

In 2006, he worked as DJ Mandla on Jozi FM where he later released his first album Jozi Nights Volume 1. In the same year, he appeared in the first season of SABC1 drama The Lab and played the role of "Mdu". After the success of the show, the series was renewed for a second season, where Hlatshwayo reprised his role in 2008. Meanwhile, he played the role of "Dr Victor Ngubane" on the e.tv soap opera Backstage. In 2009, he acted in the film Finding Lenny directed by Neal Sundstrom. In 2013, he acted in the miniseries Last Hope. Hours before his death, he participated in the program Soweto Walk 4 Life broadcast in Jozi FM.

== Death ==
On 14 May 2017, Hlatshwayo was shot dead in the heart during a robbery at Meli Lounge Pub in Pimville, Soweto, when he was 40 years of age. The incident occurred when a group of men robbed mobile phones of two women outside the pub. After seeing this, Hlatshwayo and one of his friends, Oupa "Chom-Chom" Duma, tried to rescue the women, but both of them were shot dead by the robbers. The next day, four people were arrested for the incident with firearms and drugs. He was later buried with a tombstone worth R70,000.

== Filmography ==
Year	Film	Role	Genre	Ref.
1996	Soul City 2		TV series	
1998	Deafening Silence		TV series	
1998	Kelebone		TV series	
1999	Generations	Siphiwe Phosa	TV series	
2006	The Lab	Mdu	TV series	
2007	Backstage	Doctor Victor Ngubane	TV series	
2009	Finding Lenny	Gift	Film	
2013	Last Hope		TV series	
