= Gyani Sundar Singh Sagar =

British Sikh scholar and activist (1917–1996)

- Born: 3 June 1917
- Died: 25 December 1996 (aged 79)

Gyani Sundar Singh Sagar (3 June 1917 – 25 December 1996), commonly known as Gyani Ji, was a British Sikh scholar and social activist. He dedicated his life to various campaigns for Sikh rights to be recognised and respected in the United Kingdom. Principal among those were his fight for the turban including a seven year campaign for Sikh bus conductors in Manchester to be able to wear the turban as part of their uniform and his protest against The Motorcycle Crash Helmets Act of 1972 so Sikhs could legally be allowed to wear turbans instead of crash helmets.

He was a well-respected pillar of the Sikh community and was involved in setting up one of the first Sikh temples (gurdwara) in Europe in Manchester in 1953.

== Early life and education ==
Gyani Sundar Singh Sagar was born in the village of Ghalotian Kalan, Sialkot, Punjab, India (now in Pakistan). He started his education at the Scott Mission High School and went on to the Punjab University in Amritsar, where he graduated with an honours degree in Punjabi language and literature. His degree in religious studies earned him the title Gyani.

Shortly following his graduation, he accompanied his father on a business trip to Great Britain, which contributed to his decision to permanently settle there after the Partition of India in 1947.

During Partition, Gyani Ji's home in Sialkot suddenly became part of Pakistan, so the Sagar family had to flee to India.

After living in India for a time, Gyani Ji settled in Manchester in 1948. He made a living at first as a freelance salesman but also spent much of his time, using his education, language skills and knowledge of Britain, to aid his fellow Sikhs across the UK.

== Personal life ==
He married Rajendra Kaur in 1933 and they had three sons and three daughters.

== Social activism ==
=== Manchester bus conductor uniform and turbans (1959–1967) ===
In 1959 Gyani Ji applied to become a Manchester bus conductor. After being accepted he was then informed he would have to wear the full uniform, including the peaked cap, which would force him to abandon the wearing of his turban. Turbans are customary among observant Sikhs as they are connected to two of the 5 ks: uncut hair (kesh) which is kept neat with a ritual comb (kangha). Gyani Ji was rightly outraged at this unfair policy. Thus began a seven year-long campaign for religious tolerance and social justice with Gyani Ji taking on, not only the Manchester City Corporation, but also the unions.

His main arguments throughout the debate were that; firstly, opposition to the turban stemmed "mainly from misunderstanding and ignorance" which he made strides to rectify, secondly, that the wearing of the turban was crucial to being a "proper Sikh", and thirdly, that turbans had been accepted as part of the uniform without issue in the British army when Sikhs had fought in both World Wars with 82,000 dying in battle.

In 1959, at the beginning of his campaign, only Sikhs employed in Newcastle-upon-Tyne were allowed to wear their turbans as part of the uniform. It is noted that Gyani Ji used his extensive knowledge of local government and diplomatic methods such as writing to MPs, councillors, religious figures, senior military officials and other influential politicians as well as petitioning to get the result he wanted.

It all started at a Manchester Transport Council Meeting in July 1959, Gyani Ji's local councillor Trevor Thomas, who supported his case; put forward an amendment to allow turbans as part of the Manchester bus conductor uniform. The arguments on both sides are described as:

On the one side it was argued that the Sikhs were being discriminated against on grounds of religion. The rule about caps was largely a dead letter anyway, and could hardly be worth making an issue about.... On the other side it was pointed out that the Transport Department did not practice discrimination, since it employed large numbers of coloured workers. To allow a precedent in this matter could lead to all sorts of unauthorised uniforms. Various bogeys were raised – Scotsmen in kilts, dancing Irishmen with pointed caps, and Muslims interrupting bus schedules with their prayer mats. Finally, the practice of other Transport Departments in not allowing turbans was used to support the Committee's decision.

This battle was covered extensively in both the local and national press and went to several votes with the Transport Committee until the motion to allow turbans as part of the Manchester bus conductor uniform was finally passed in October 1966 with 71–23 in favour. Upon hearing the news Gyani Ji's statement to the press was "This is a victory for the people of Manchester.". While there were remaining issues with the union and Gyani Ji had passed the maximum age to become a busman, at the beginning of 1970 a young Sikh man successfully became Manchester's first serving bus conductor to wear a turban on the job.

=== Turbans vs crash helmets: 1972–1976 ===
In the early 1970s two Sikh men were stopped by police for wearing turbans instead of crash helmets on a motorcycle in Gravesend. This was against The Motorcycle Crash Helmet Act of 1972 and prompted the creation of The National Turban Action Committee.

Gyani Ji was invited by the head of this newly-formed organisation, Baldev Singh Chahal, to lead campaigning to change the law so that Sikhs had the right to choose to wear a turban or a crash helmet. He later became the General Secretary of group between 16 November 1975 and 20 August 1977. Gyani Ji ensured that the issue was well-publicised and soon local and national media outlets were running stories on the problems of the "Urban Turban".

One of his main campaigning methods, aside from prolific diplomatic correspondences with political figures, was to buy himself a moped in 1976 and ride it around Manchester while wearing his turban. He was stopped, arrested and fined by police multiple times. He refused to pay these fines to show he did not recognize the validity of the prejudicial law and bring further attention to the cause.

Ultimately, this led him to be given a custodial sentence. Even though he was 57 years old and suffering from asthma and diabetes, Gyani Ji was not afraid of going to prison as it would further highlight the arguments he was making to amend the law, namely that if Sikhs had been allowed to lay down their lives for Britain during the Raj and two world wars without any legal compulsion for them to wear helmets instead of turbans, then they deserved the right to choose what to wear when riding a motorcycle. However, before he could serve his seven day sentence in Strangeways Prison, the Lord Mayor of Manchester paid his fines to spare him this punishment. Nonetheless, Gyani Ji carried on riding his moped while wearing a turban without paying his fines and was sentenced again and then finally served a week in Strangeways Prison in 1975.

Upon his release from prison, Gyani Ji's sons and supporters met him at the gates of the prison with his moped and flower garlands. They were joined by the press and Gyani Ji proceeded to ride home wearing his turban and was stopped and booked seven times. He was prepared to serve an extended stay in prison for these actions.

On 15 November 1976 an act to exempt turban-wearing followers of the Sikh religion from the requirement was passed through parliament. Gyani Ji was credited with being instrumental to this amendment.

In the 1970s Gyani Ji was also involved in a dispute with the publishers of Chambers Encyclopedia concerning an error in their entry about Guru Nanak, the founder of Sikhism and the first of the ten gurus.

The entry stated that Guru Nanak was a follower of Kabir, Indian mystic poet and saint. Subsequently, Gyani Ji was involved in over 400 correspondences, some of these with the later disgraced owner of Chambers, Robert Maxwell, to have this amended. Finally, after approximately a ten year period, they finally agreed to his changes and the offending entry was edited.

=== Legacy ===
Gyani Ji left behind a rich legacy for the Sikh community, Manchester and the UK upon his death in 1996.

Throughout his life, aside from his social activism, he occupied important positions in the Sikh community such as Religious Advisor and Head of Turban Committee of the three Manchester Sikh Temples, Sikh Representative at the Executive of Manchester Council for Community Relations and other essential roles pictured.

His tireless work for the promotion of religious tolerance and equality was covered in local and national press at the time but has also since been commemorated in many different ways.

Gyani Ji's campaign for bus conductors to be able to wear turbans as part of their uniform was contrasted to others around the country, for instance in Wolverhampton, in David Beetham's Transport and Turbans: A Comparative Study in Local Politics, published in 1970.

His obituary appeared in The Daily Telegraph on 3 January 1997.

In 2016, Manchester Central Library organised an exhibition where his moped was put on display and his fight for the turban campaigns explained along with other crucial activists from the area. This was in collaboration with the Ahmed Iqbal Ullah Race Relations Resource Centre and attracted many visitors.

Equally, Lemn Sissay covered his campaigning in his BBC documentary Race Apart in 2015 to mark the fortieth anniversary of the Race Relations Act 1965.
