= Salvador Wildlife Management Area =

Protected area in Louisiana, US

- Salvador WMA
- IUCN category V (protected landscape/seascape)
- Location within Louisiana
- Location: St. Charles Parish, Louisiana
- Coordinates: 29°48′13″N 90°14′16″W:
- Area: 34,520 acres (139.7 km^{2})
- Established: 1968
- Governing body: Louisiana Department of Wildlife and Fisheries

Salvador WMA

Salvador Wildlife Management Area (Salvador WMA) is a protected area in St. Charles Parish Louisiana covering a combined total of over 36,000 acres (15,000 ha). The WMA is located 11 miles (18 km) south of New Orleans, Louisiana, and provides habitat for many species of animal and plant life with hunting, fishing, and boating as the predominant activities. Commercial fishing or harvesting is not allowed.

== Description ==
Salvador WMA is surrounded on three sides by water with Lake Cataouatche to the northeast, Bayou Couba to the east, and Lake Salvador to the south, all considered part of the Wetlands of Louisiana. The WMA is only accessible by boat with the more direct route from US 90 at the Pier 90 Marina down Bayou Verret to Lake Salvador.

The northwestern section of the WMA is marshland fed by the Davis Pond Diversion canal. The canal serves as flood control and as a means of sediment replenishment. The benefits stretch through Bayou Perot and Bayou Rigolettes to Little Lake, Hackberry Bay, Creole Bay, Mendicant Island, the surrounding waterways, and ultimately providing sediment to Barataria Bay and the barrier islands of Grand Isle and Grand Terre

== Combined management ==
The 2,867 acres (1,160 ha) Timken Wildlife Management Area is jointly managed with the Salvador WMA and referred to as the Salvador/Timken Wildlife Management Area. The Timken WMA is located entirely on Couba Island between Lake Salvador and Lake Cataouatche and is leased (ends on December 31, 2020) from the City Park Commission of New Orleans. The Salvador/Timken WMA headquarters are located within the Salvador WMA.

== History ==
The Louisiana Department of Wildlife and Fisheries purchased land for the WMA from Humble Oil Company in 1968. An additional 3,101.16 acres was purchased from the Netherlands Corporation in 1976 and 1,960 acres from the St. Rose Land Company in 1986.

In July 2017 Ducks Unlimited assisted in the purchase of 1,777 acres of wetlands, the White property also known as the "White Tract", that borders the northeast side of Salvador WMA, includes Lanaux Canal through the center, and Bayou Verret borders the east side to Lake Salvador. The Jean Lafitte National Historic Park and Preserve begins on the east side of Bayou Verret providing 55,000 acres of protected public lands. The Wetlands America Trust, used by Ducks Unlimited, previous property owners, Ducks Unlimited's Gulf Coast Initiative, LDWF, Louisiana Coastal Protection and Restoration Authority and a North American Wetlands Conservation Act grant, were all instrumental in the closing of the land deal.

== Oilfields and canals ==
Oilfield access canals are dispersed throughout the WMA. They range from the Texas line through the Chenier Plain and the Deltaic Plain, and have been considered a contributing factor in coastal erosion in Louisiana since at least 1925 to 1930, along with other factors such as storm surges and levees, that disrupted the dynamic river system, causing the gaping wound in the historic shape of "the boot" and calls for a renaming. The land loss, currently about the size of the state of Delaware, loses about a football length an hour.
