= St. Charles Borromeo Catholic Church (Destrehan, Louisiana) =

Catholic Church in Destrehan, Louisiana

Coordinates: 29.95039°N 90.37522°W

- View of the church from River Rd.
- St. Charles Borromeo Catholic Church
- Location: Destrehan, Louisiana
- Country: United States
- Denomination: Catholic Church
- Website: scblittleredchurch.org

History
- Status: Church
- Founded: 1723
- Dedicated: January 25, 1922

Architecture
- Style: Spanish Colonial (Renaissance)

Administration
- Archdiocese: Archdiocese of New Orleans

Clergy
- Archbishop: Gregory Aymond

St. Charles Borromeo Catholic Church is a Catholic church and second-oldest ecclesiastical parish in the Archdiocese of New Orleans. The church and grounds are located at 13396 River Road in Destrehan, Louisiana.

== Early ecclesiastical parish history ==
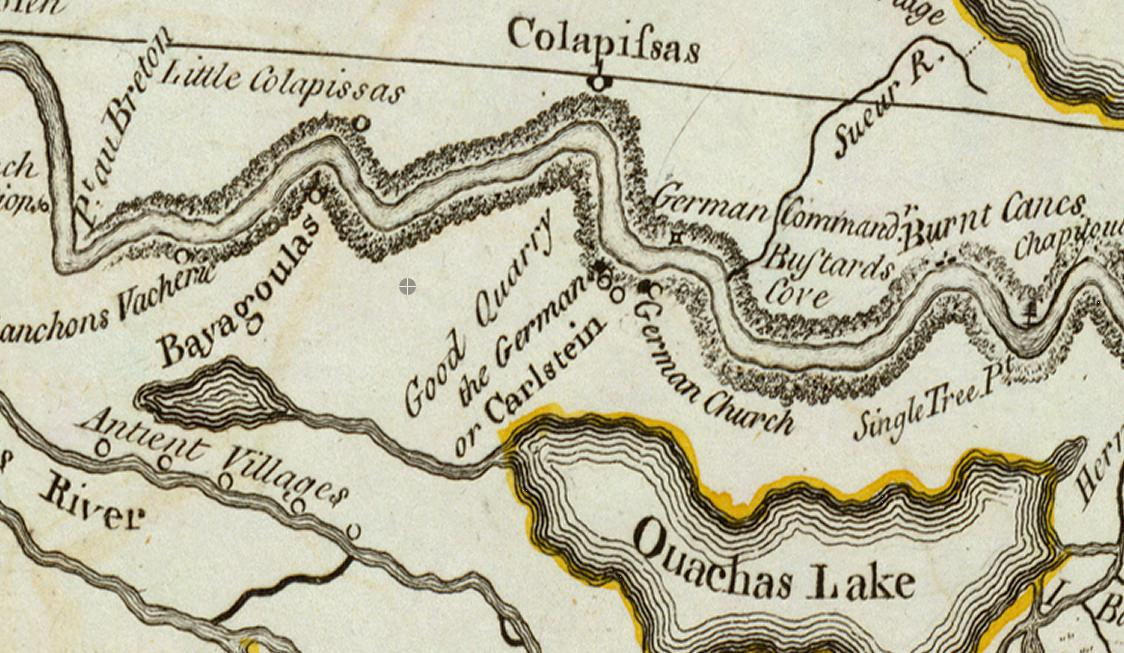
Map of the German Coast, 1775. Carlstein and German Church are located on the west bank of the Mississippi River.

=== La Paroisse de St. Jean des Allemands ===
The ecclesiastical parish and chapel, La Paroisse de St. Jean des Allemands (The Parish of St. John, of the Germans), were founded in 1723 in Karlstein by Capuchin missionary priests. The site was on the westbank of the Mississippi River near present-day Taft, Louisiana.

== Church history ==
=== St. Charles Chapel ===
In 1740, the ecclesiastical parish and chapel relocated to the present-day site of the church on the eastbank of the Mississippi River. A log cabin structure was built and both the ecclesiastical parish and chapel were renamed St. Charles in honor of St. Charles Borromeo.

=== Little Red Church ===
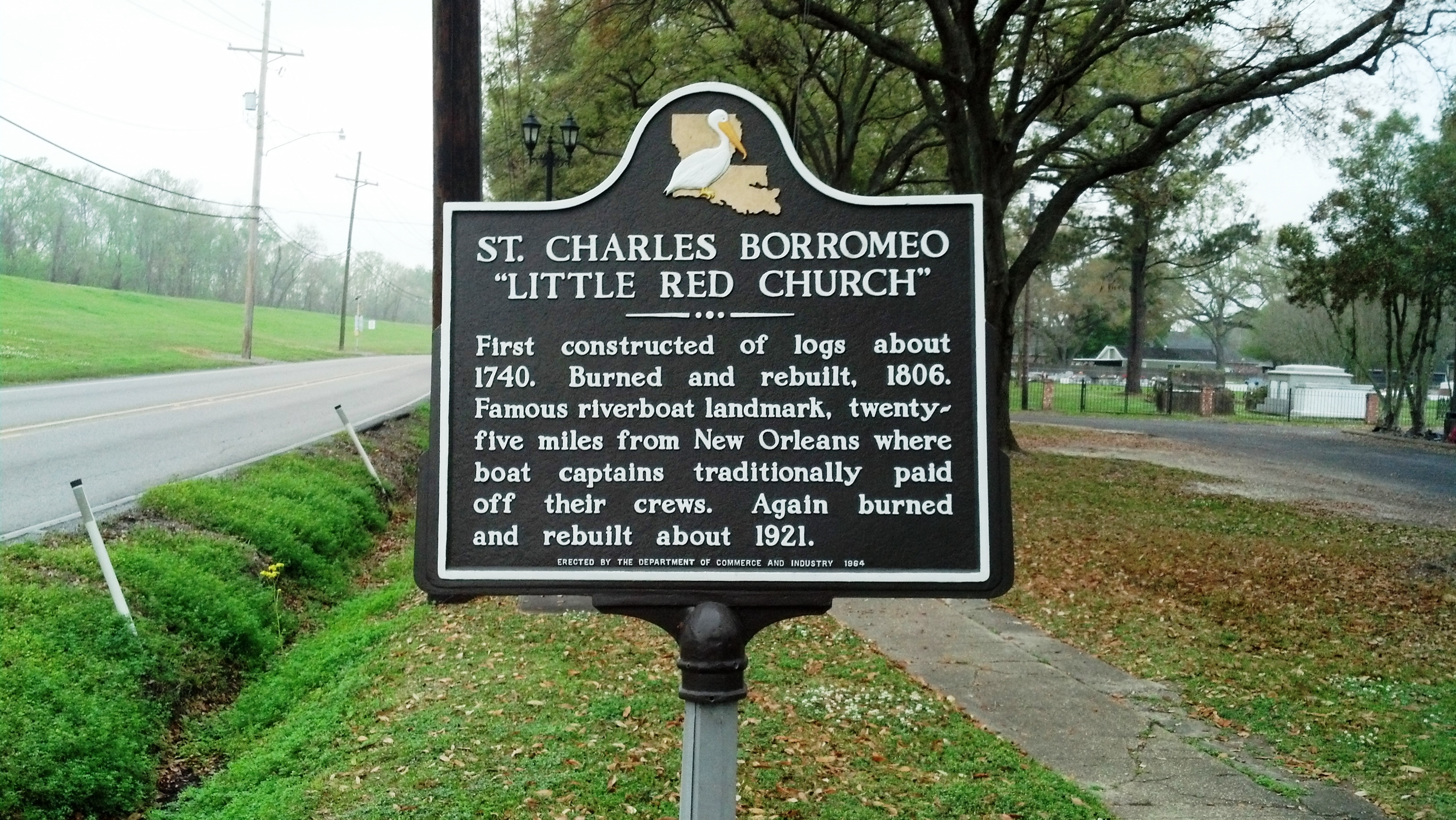
St. Charles Borromeo Catholic Church, "Little Red Church" - Historical Marker

The log cabin chapel built in 1740, burned in 1806 and was replaced by a wood-framed church painted red during that same year. The church became known as the "Little Red Church". It was a famous riverboat landmark where boat captains traditionally paid off their crews. In 1877, a fire destroyed the rectory and left the church without a pastor. Starting in 1890, the church entered a period of interdiction, losing the pastoral support of Archbishop Francis Janssens due to conflicts with the church charter and wardens. In 1917, a parochial charter was adopted and St. Charles Borromeo ecclesiastical parish was reinstated to the diocese by Archbishop James Blenk. In 1921, the "Little Red Church" burned and the current church was built on the property that same year.

=== St. Charles Borromeo Catholic Church ===
St. Charles Borromeo Catholic Church was dedicated on January 25, 1922. It was constructed with a white façade and a Spanish tile roof. A statue of Saint Charles Borromeo is enshrined in front of the church. The altar stone of the church rests on a walnut tree trunk imported from Arona, Italy. The tree is estimated to be four-hundred years old and dates back to the time Charles Borromeo was in Arona, Italy (16th century).

In 1929, a convent was built and the rectory was rebuilt by elevating the ground buildings and closing in the ground level.

In November 2025, the Archdiocese of New Orleans placed over 150 parishes and charities in Chapter 11 bankruptcy protection as part of a settlement plan to resolve hundreds of sex abuse lawsuits. This wave of bankruptcies included this church.

== Cemetery ==
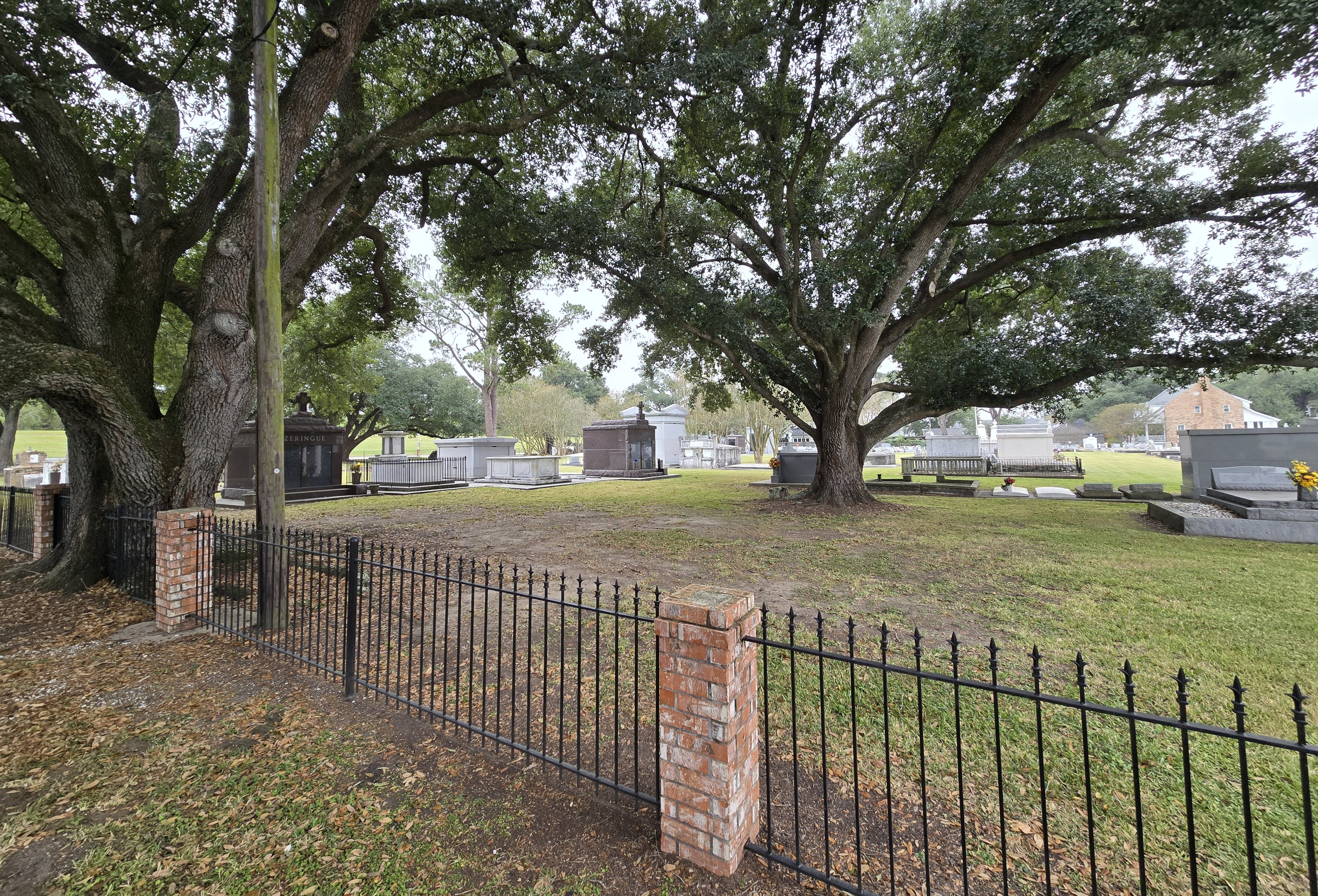
St. Charles Borromeo Catholic Church Cemetery

The Saint Charles Borromeo Catholic Church Cemetery was established at the site as early as 1723.

The cemetery is today recognized as the South’s oldest German cemetery. Charles Frederick d'Arensbourg, leader of the German Coast, is buried in the cemetery, but his grave was lost due to the shifting Mississippi River.

The Destréhan Family tombs are located in the cemetery. Louisiana state senator Jean Noël Destréhan, who died in 1823, is buried in the cemetery, but his grave was also lost due to the shifting Mississippi River. He is the namesake for the town, one-time owner of Destrehan Plantation, and the first U.S. Senator elected from Louisiana, along with Allan B. Magruder. Nicolas Noël Destréhan (d. 1848), fourth son of Jean Noël Destréhan, and another son René Noël Destréhan (1807–1836), are buried in the cemetery; as is their sister, Marie Eléonore "Zelia" Destréhan Henderson (1800–1830).

The oldest remaining burial plot is of Elizabeth Dubord, who died in 1777. This plot also contains the remains of François Trepagnier, who died in the 1811 German Coast uprising.

== Schools ==
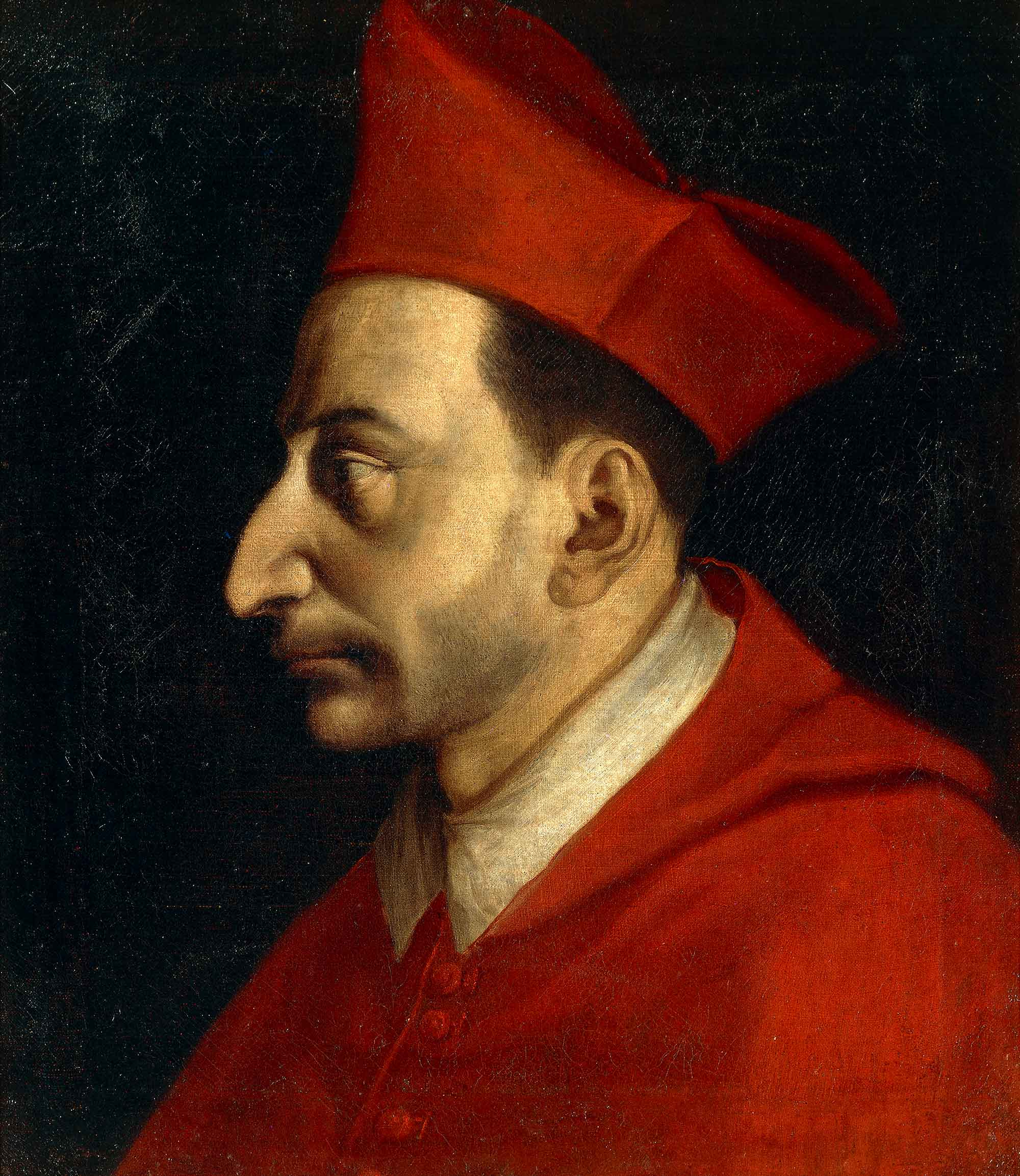
Saint Charles Borromeo

=== St. Charles Borromeo School ===
In 1929, an elementary school was built on the grounds. It was the first parochial school opened between New Orleans and Baton Rouge. It is still located on the church grounds in Destrehan.

=== St. Charles Borromeo High School ===
In 1948, a parochial high school, St. Charles Borromeo High School, opened on the church grounds. It was operated by the Sisters of the Congregation of the Immaculate Conception.

In 1960, the Sisters of the Most Holy Sacrament took over operation of the high school and in 1978 it moved to LaPlace, Louisiana becoming St. Charles Catholic High School.

== Gallery ==
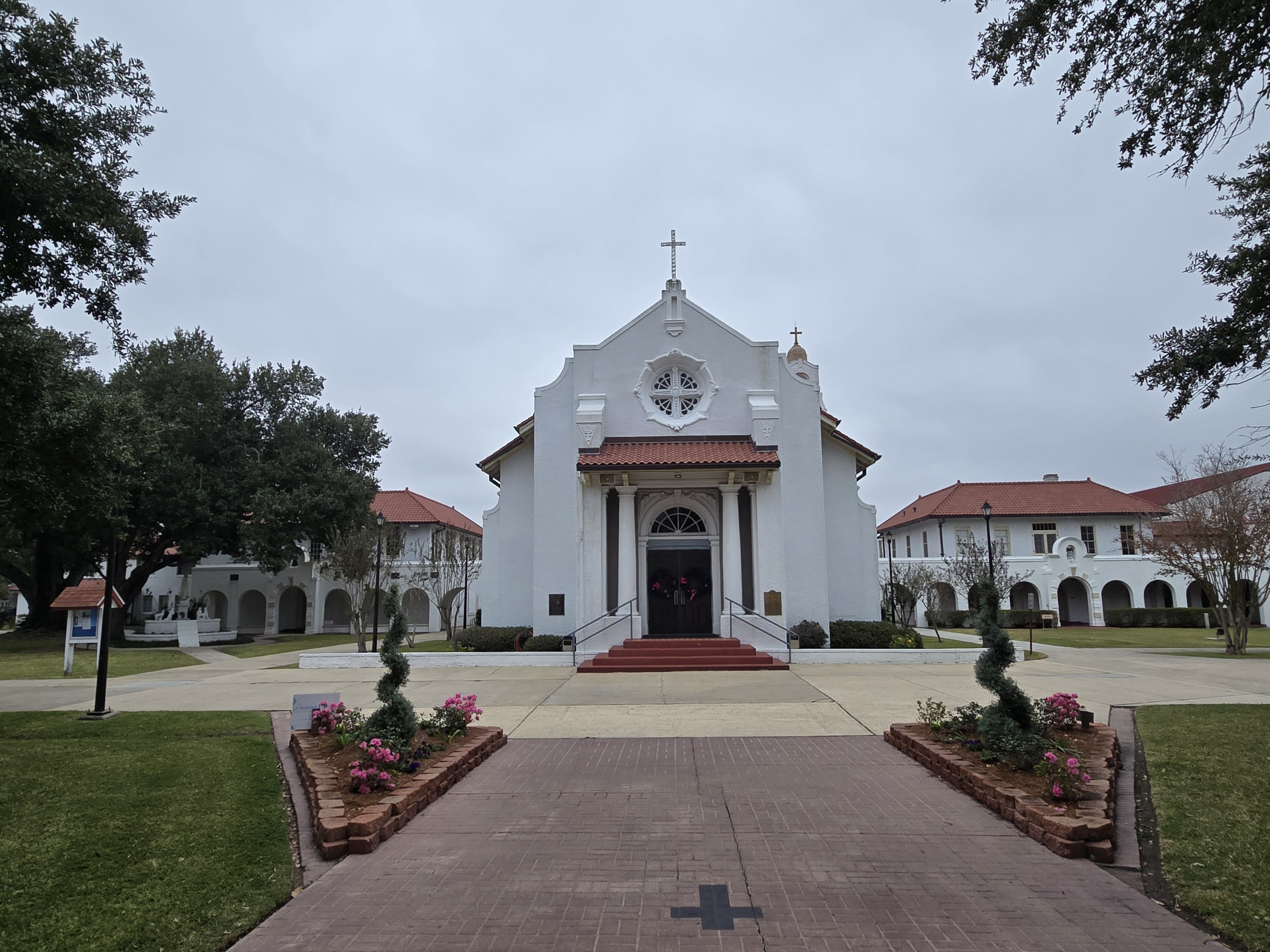
St. Charles Borromeo Catholic Church, Latin Cross

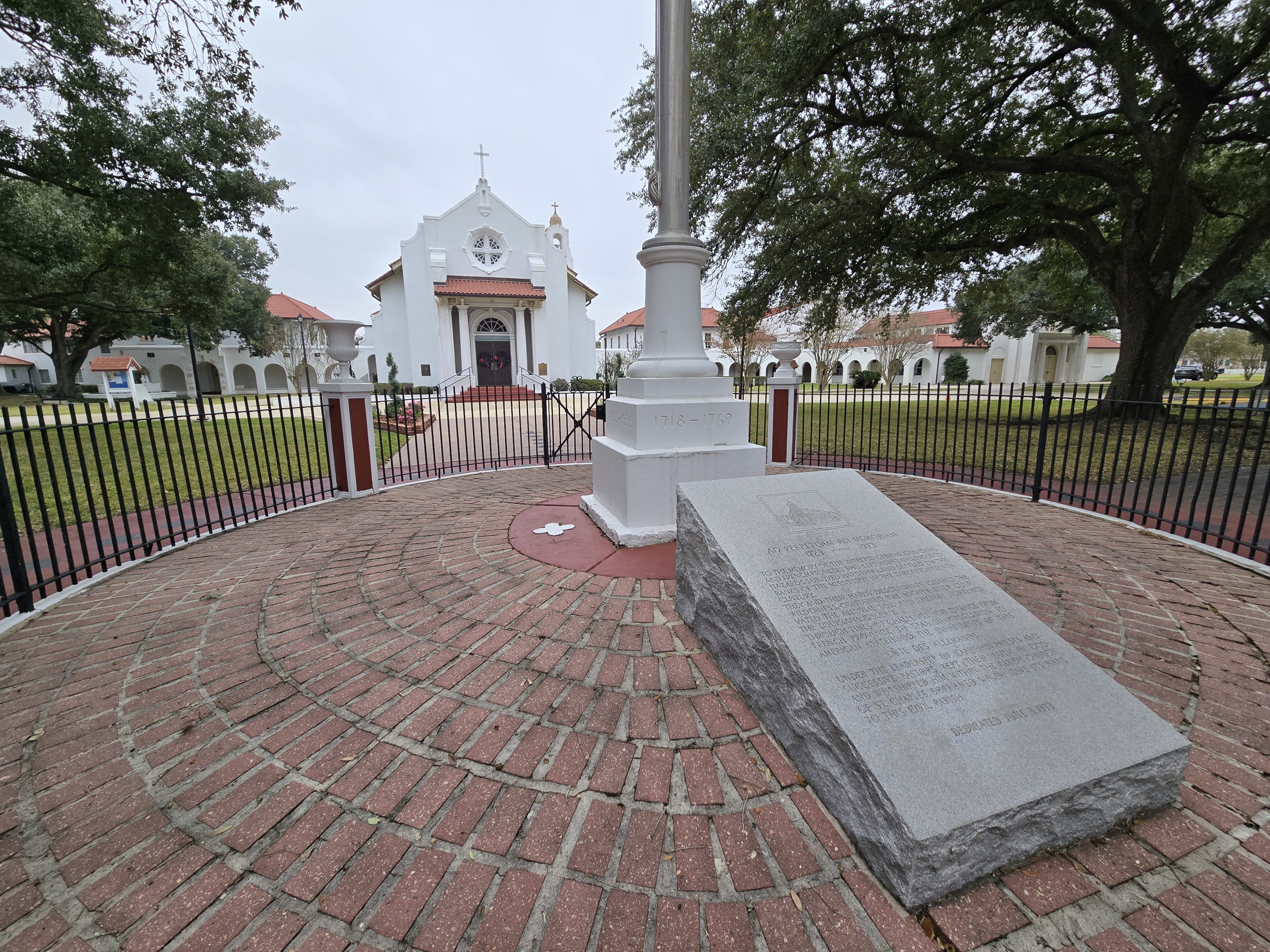
St. Charles Borromeo Catholic Church, Parish History

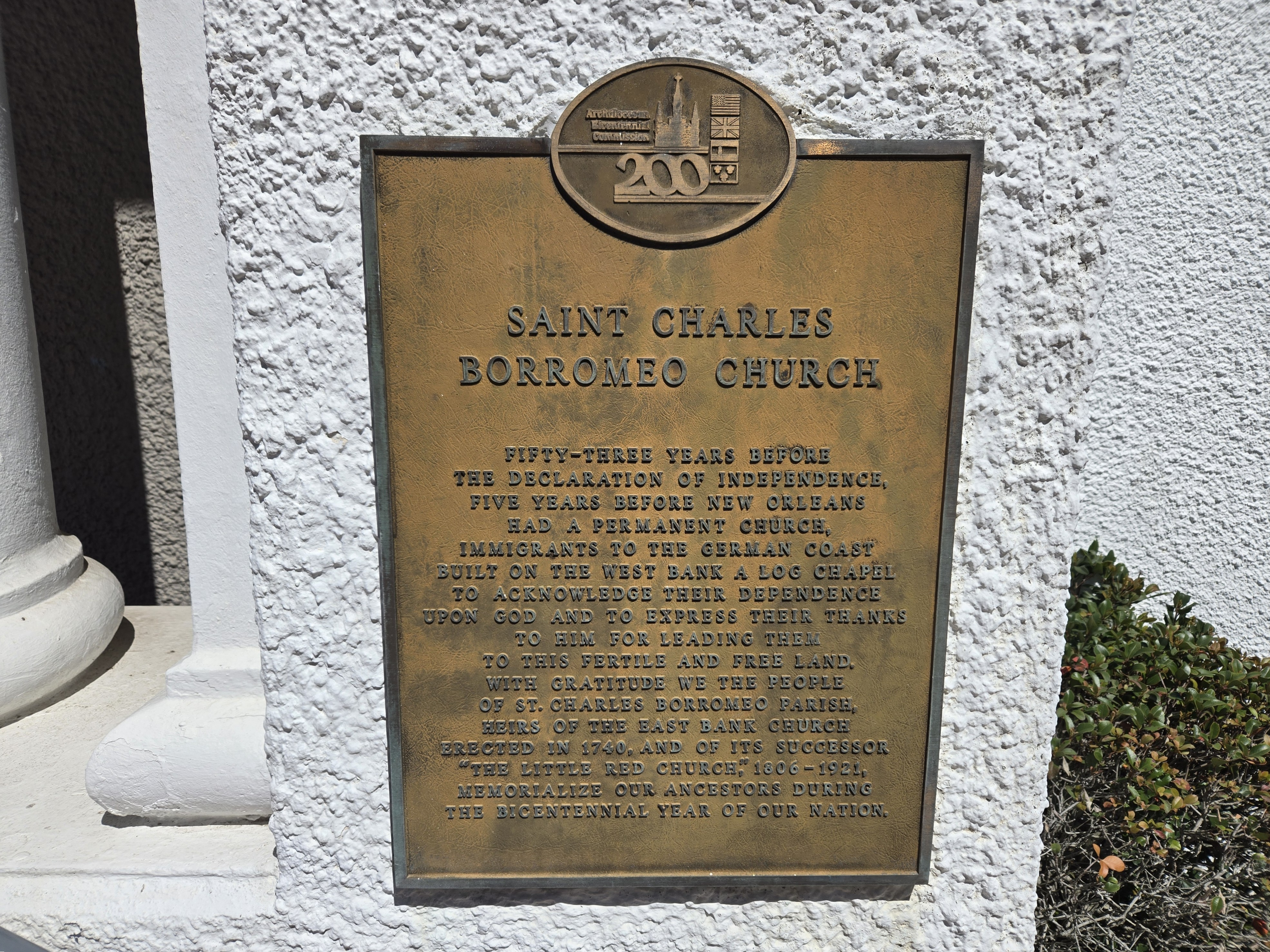
St. Charles Borromeo Catholic Church, Historical Plaque

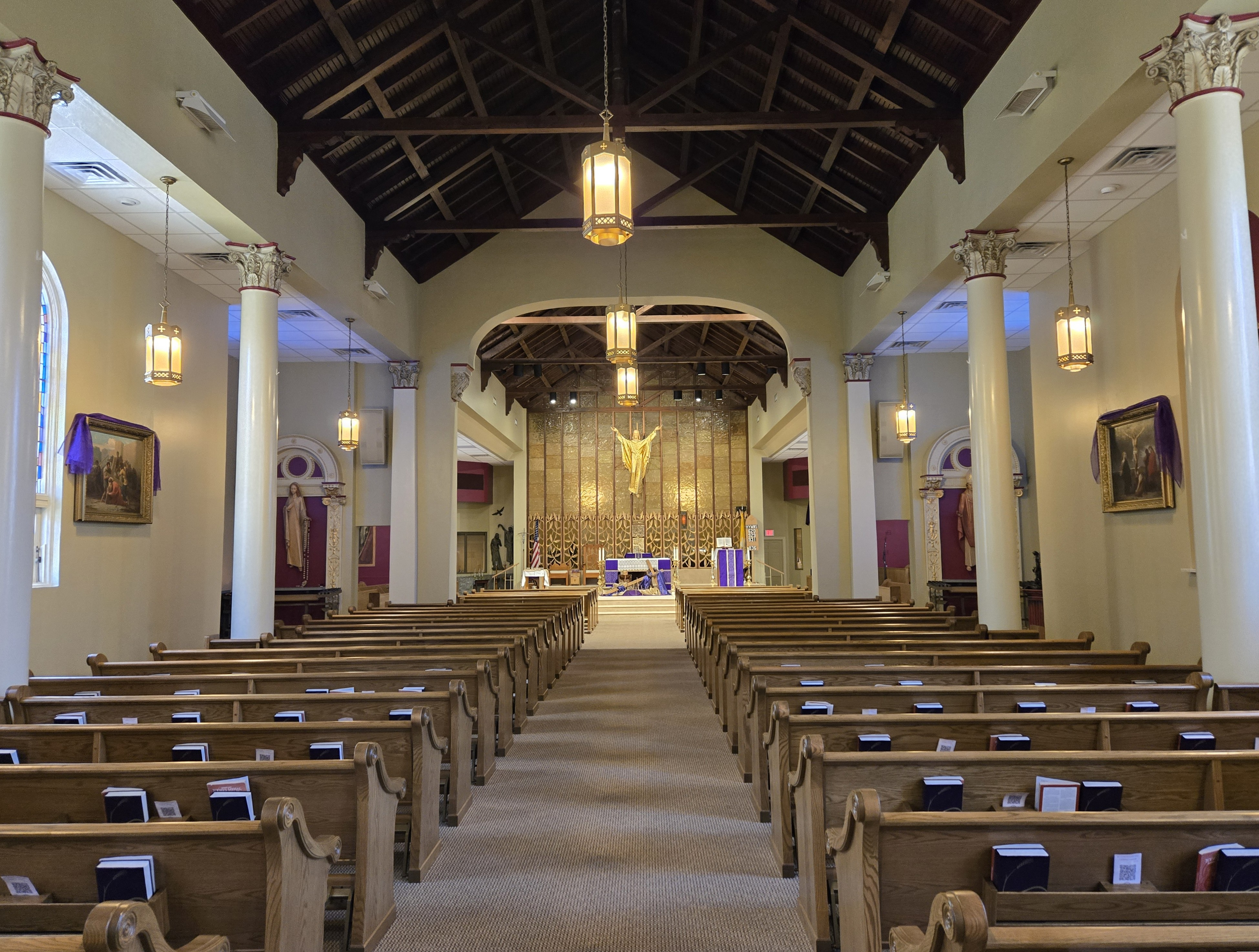
St. Charles Borromeo Catholic Church, Nave

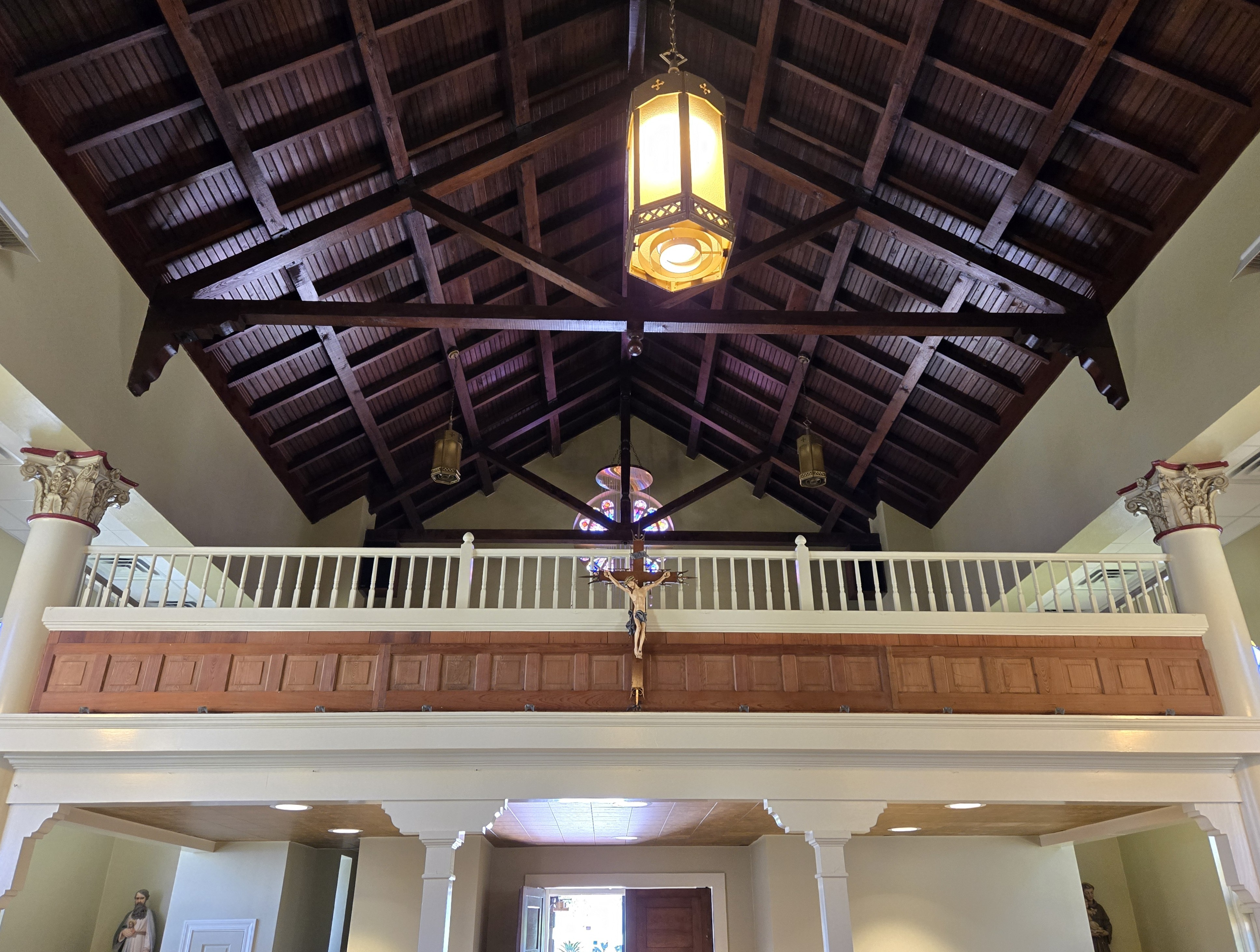
St. Charles Borromeo Catholic Church, Gallery

== See also ==
- List of churches in the Roman Catholic Archdiocese of New Orleans
- Saint Charles Borromeo
- St. Charles Parish, Louisiana
