= Des Allemands, Louisiana =

- Unincorporated community Census-designated place
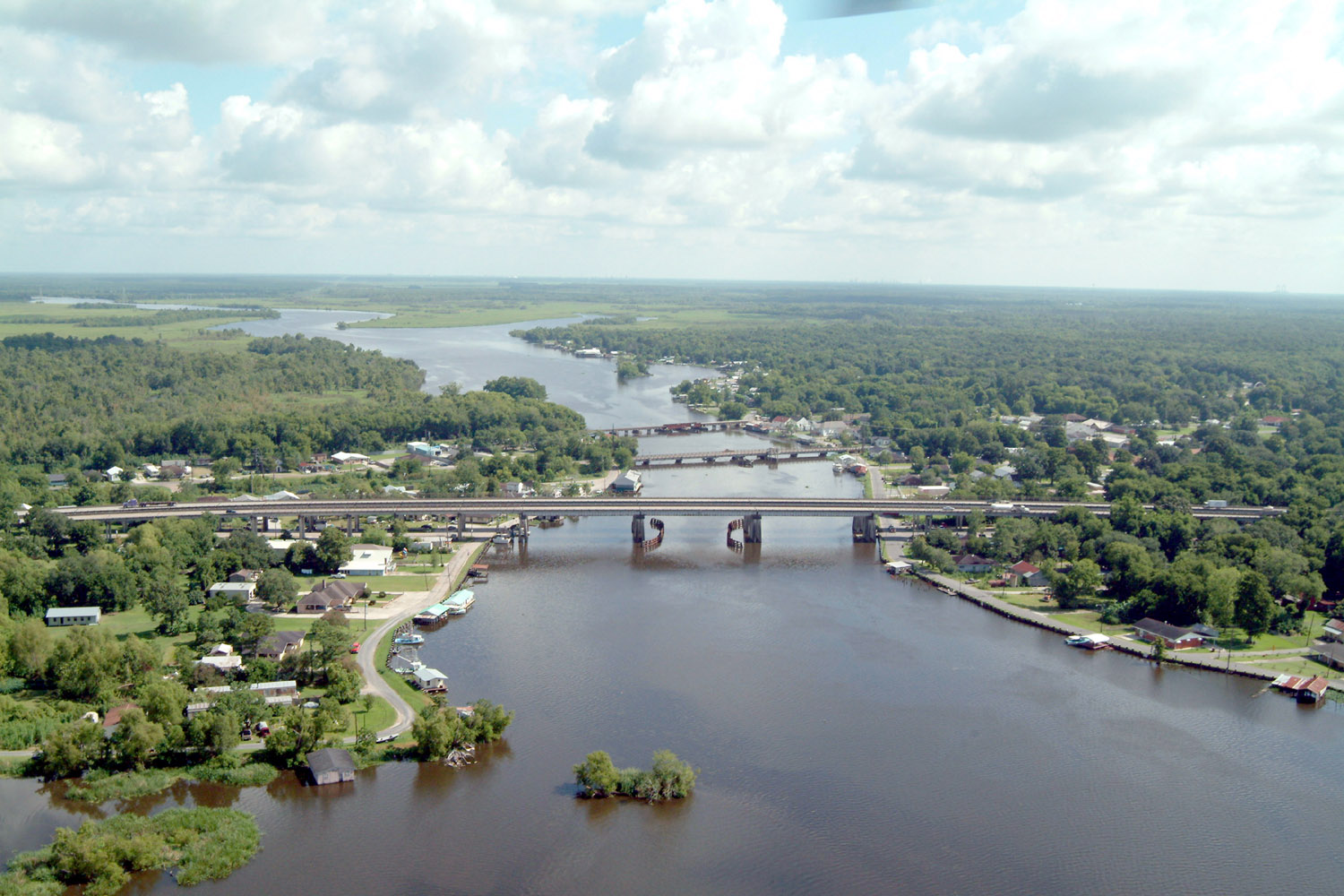
- Des Allemands on the Bayou des Allemands. View to the north.
- Etymology: French for "The Germans"
- Nickname: "Catfish Capital of the Universe"
- Location in Louisiana Location in the United States
- Coordinates: 29°49′32″N 90°28′09″W
- Country: United States
- State: Louisiana
- Parishes: Lafourche, St. Charles

Area
  - Total: 12.24 sq mi (31.69 km^{2})
  - Land: 9.95 sq mi (25.77 km^{2})
  - Water: 2.29 sq mi (5.92 km^{2})
- Elevation: 3 ft (0.91 m)

Population (2020)
  - Total: 2,179
  - Density: 219.0/sq mi (84.56/km^{2})
- Time zone: UTC-6 (CST)
  - Summer (DST): UTC-5 (CDT)
- ZIP Code: 70030
- Area code: 985
- FIPS code: 22-20680

Des Allemands is an unincorporated community and census-designated place (CDP) in Lafourche and St. Charles parishes in the southeastern part of the U.S. state of Louisiana. The population was 2,179 at the 2020 census. The town, known as the "Catfish Capital of the Universe", is along the Bayou des Allemands, which is the boundary of Lafourche and St. Charles parishes. Lac des Allemands is located northwest of the town. The ZIP Code for Des Allemands is 70030.

The St. Charles Parish portion of Des Allemands is part of the New Orleans metropolitan statistical area, while the Lafourche Parish portion is part of the Houma–Bayou Cane–Thibodaux metropolitan statistical area.

== History ==
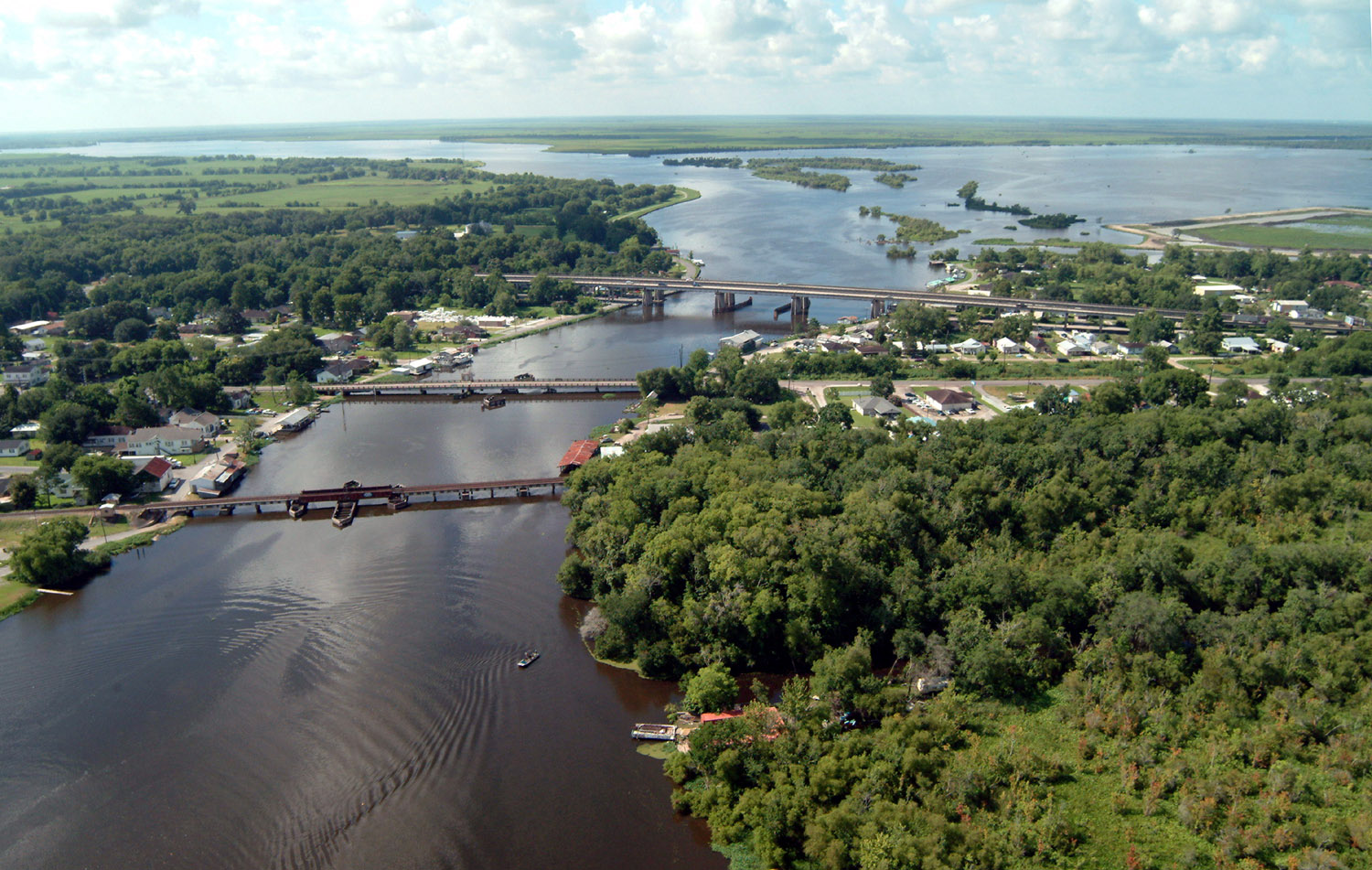
Bayou Des Allemands in 2003. View is to the south.

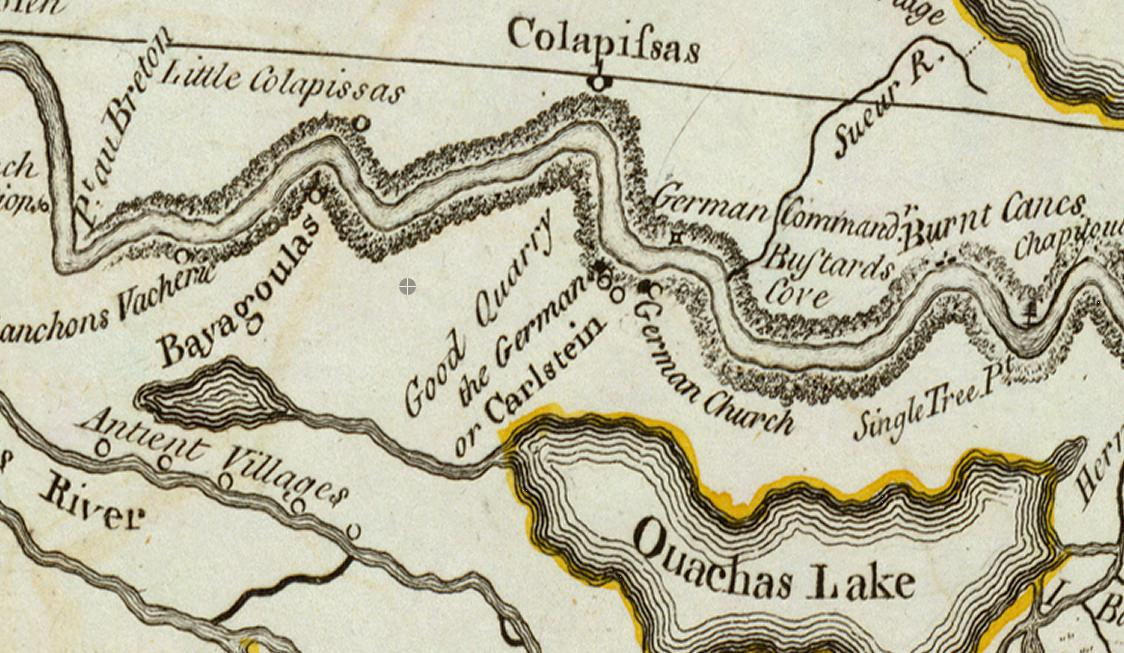
18th-century map of the German Coast

In 1721, John Law and the Company of the Indies settled Germans along the Mississippi River, north of Ouachas Lake. The area of the Germans was called les Allemands (the Germans) or Karlstein. The German Coast was in present-day St. Charles & St. John the Baptist parishes. Des Allemands means "of the Germans" or simply "Germans" in French.

The German Louisiana colony was originally up the Mississippi River at the Arkansas Post. But they experienced hostility from the Native Americans in that area, and moved to a location much closer to the colonial capital of New Orleans.

== Catfish Festival ==
An annual Catfish Festival is held in Des Allemands; it involves live music, carnival attractions, and catfish related recipes. The festival was started by local reverend William McCallion as a fundraiser for his church. The festival celebrated its 45th anniversary in 2020. However, in this year, the festival had to be rescheduled due to concerns arising from the 2020 COVID-19 pandemic. It is likely that the Catfish Festival will no longer be held. The Archdiocese of New Orleans has closed the local church, St. Gertrude, and has sold the property.

== Geography ==
Des Allemands is located in southern St. Charles Parish and northeastern Lafourche Parish at 29°49′32″N 90°28′9″W (29.825570, -90.469163). It is bordered to the north by the Paradis CDP and to the southeast by the Bayou Gauche CDP.

U.S. Route 90 (future Interstate 49) crosses Bayou des Allemands at this point; the four-lane highway leads northeast 34 miles (55 km) to New Orleans and west 51 miles (82 km) to Morgan City. Bayou Des Allemands runs northwest 5 miles (8 km) to Lac des Allemands and southeast 13 miles (21 km) to Lake Salvador.

According to the United States Census Bureau, the Des Allemands CDP has a total area of 12.2 square miles (31.7 km^{2}), of which 10.0 square miles (25.8 km^{2}) are land and 2.3 square miles (5.9 km^{2}), or 18.68%, are water.

== Demographics ==
Historical population
Census	Pop.	Note	%±
1980	2,920		—
1990	2,504		−14.2%
2000	2,500		−0.2%
2010	2,505		0.2%
2020	2,179		−13.0%
U.S. Decennial Census; 1950 1960 1970 1980; 1990 2000 2010

Des Allemands first appeared as a census designated place in the 1980 U.S. census.

Des Allemands racial composition as of 2020
Race	Number	Percentage
White (non-Hispanic)	1,700	78.02%
Black or African American (non-Hispanic)	296	13.58%
Native American	23	1.06%
Asian	4	0.18%
Other/Mixed	84	3.85%
Hispanic or Latino	72	3.3%

As of the 2020 United States census, there were 2,179 people, 670 households, and 468 families residing in the CDP.

== Education ==
St. Charles Parish Public School System serves parts of Des Allemands east of Bayou Des Allemands. Allemands Elementary School in Des Allemands serves grades PK-2, while R.J. Vial Elementary School in Paradis serves grades 3–5; Vial opened in 1975. J. B. Martin Middle School in Paradis serves grades 6–8, and Hahnville High School in Boutte serves 9–12.

Residents of Des Allemands west of Bayou Des Allemands attend Lafourche Parish Public Schools. People in the Bayou Des Allemands area of Lafourche Parish are zoned to Raceland Lower Elementary School, Raceland Upper Elementary School, Raceland Middle School (all in Raceland), and Central Lafourche High School in Mathews.

Fletcher Technical Community College has Lafourche Parish in the college's service area. Additionally, a Delgado Community College document stated that Lafourche Parish was in the college's service area.

== Festivals ==
- Louisiana Catfish Festival on the third weekend in June
- Small parade in conjunction with Mardi Gras season

== See also ==
- German Coast
- Live and Let Die: The motor boat chase scene in Roger Moore's debut James Bond movie was filmed in Bayou Des Allemands.
