= St. Charles Parish, Louisiana =

Parish in Louisiana, United States

St. Charles Parish
- Parish
- Parish of St. Charles; Paroisse de Saint-Charles (French)
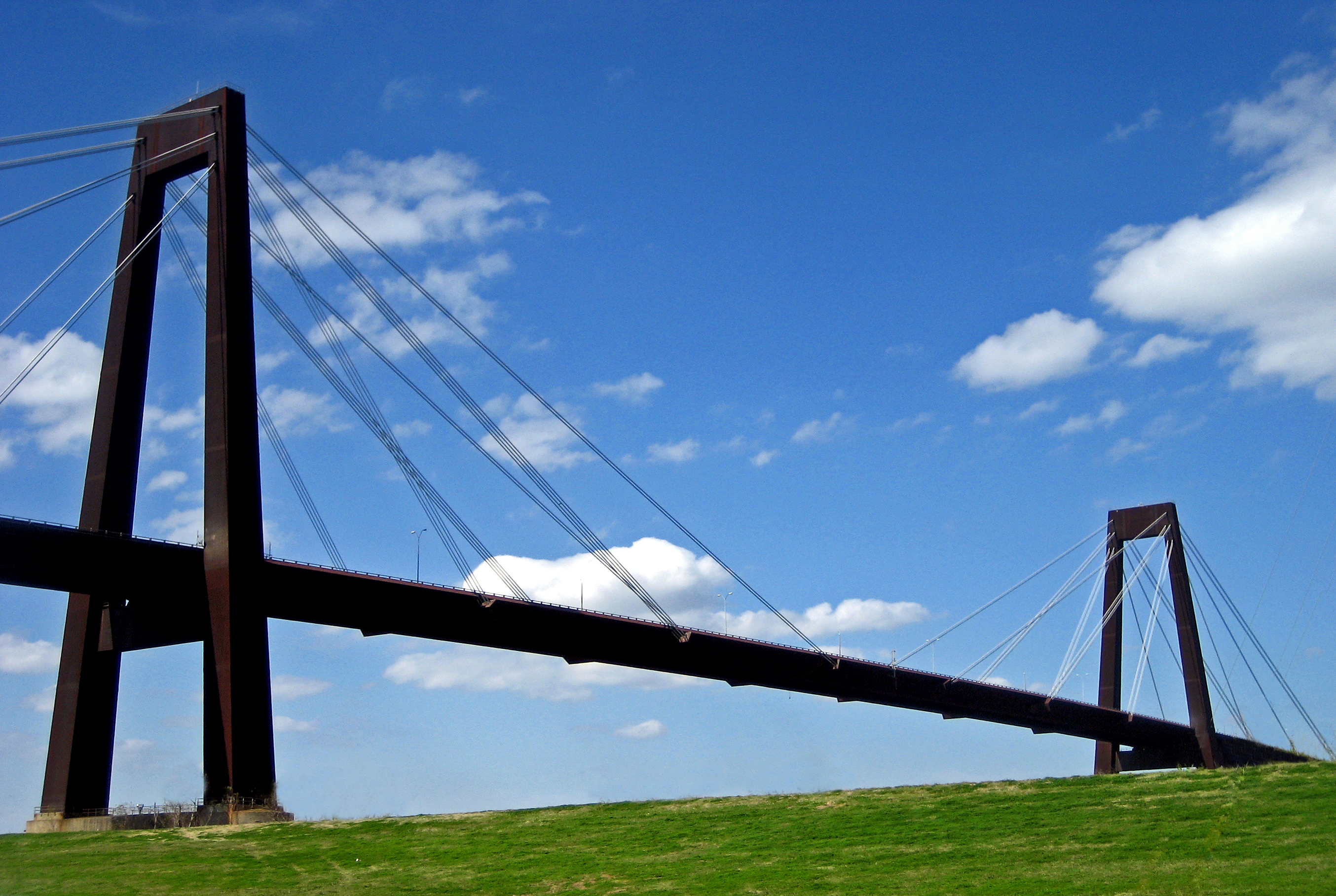
- Hale Boggs Memorial Bridge

- Seal Logo

- Location within the U.S. state of Louisiana
- Coordinates: 29°55′N 90°22′W
- Country: United States
- State: Louisiana
- Founded: 1807
- Named for: St. Charles
- Seat: Hahnville
- Largest community: Luling

Area
  - Total: 411 sq mi (1,060 km^{2})
  - Land: 279 sq mi (720 km^{2})
  - Water: 132 sq mi (340 km^{2}) 32%

Population (2020)
  - Total: 52,549
  - Estimate (2025): 50,586 ▼
  - Density: 188.35/sq mi (72.72/km^{2})
- Time zone: UTC−6 (Central)
  - Summer (DST): UTC−5 (CDT)
- Congressional districts: 2nd, 6th
- Website: www.stcharlesparish.gov

St. Charles Parish (French: Paroisse de Saint-Charles) is a parish located in the U.S. state of Louisiana. At the 2020 census, its population was 52,549. The parish seat is Hahnville and the most populous community is Luling.

The parish was established in 1807, following the Louisiana Purchase by the United States in 1803. It was originally part of the German Coast, an area along the east bank of the Mississippi River that was settled by numerous German pioneers in the 1720s. This was historically an area of sugarcane plantations, but the energy industry is now the economic base of the parish. St. Charles Parish is split by the Mississippi River and includes territory on both sides of the river, the east and west banks.

St. Charles Parish is included in the New Orleans-Metairie metropolitan statistical area.

== History ==
=== 17th century ===
In 1682, French explorers René-Robert Cavelier, Sieur de La Salle and Henri de Tonti traveled the entire length of the Mississippi River and as their expedition passed what is present-day Hahnville on the west bank; they encountered indigenous Quinipissa villagers. In 1699, Pierre Le Moyne d'Iberville, along with his younger brother, Jean-Baptiste Le Moyne de Bienville returned to the area claiming it for France. They found an indigenous Bayagoula settlement near the river's intersection with a tributary at a site named L’Anse aux Outardes or Bustard’s Cove in present-day New Sarpy on the east bank of the Mississippi River. It was discovered that the Quinapissa had joined the indigenous Mougoulacha and they later moved to the east bank of the river to form one village with the Bayougoula near L’Anse aux Outardes.

=== 18th century ===
As early as 1718, John Law and the Company of the Indies began recruiting French settlers to settle Louisiana (New France), though not specifically to what would become the German Coast. The early French settlers were not suited or prepared for the harsh conditions in Louisiana. In 1719, Jean-Pierre Pury, a director at the Company of the Indies, proposed recruiting Germans and German-speaking Swiss farmers to Louisiana and that same year with a twenty-five-year charter, Law merged the Company of the West with his Company of the Indies. Also in 1719, a small group of German settlers arrived in the Louisiana French colony and were transported by waterways thirty miles west of New Orleans to a location along the west bank of the Mississippi River, north of Ouachas Lake. This area of German settlers was called les Allemands or the Germans.

In 1720, Germans were recruited in early spring to settle in les Allemands. Roughly four thousand individuals (four hundred and fifty families) mostly from the Rhineland, but also from Baden-Württemberg, Bavaria, Swedish Pomerania, Alsace–Lorraine, Belgium, and Switzerland traveled across France to Lorient in Brittany and then made the voyage to Louisiana on March 7, 1721. The settlers arrived in Old Biloxi on June 4, 1721, and on December 15, 1721, French Governor Bienville issued an order for boats to transport the recently arrived German-speaking settlers including newly named Commandant Charles Frederic d'Arensbourg, born Karl Friedrich von Arensburg, to the already established villages of Hoffen, Marienthal, and Augsburg on the west bank of the Mississippi River. The settlers left for the settlements in January 1722 and of the roughly four thousand individuals that initially began the trip in Europe, when they reached their port of embarkation in March 1722, a Company of the Indies official counted only three hundred and thirty settlers because many of them perished due to the harsh conditions of their long journey to Louisiana. d'Arensbourg's land grant concession on the west bank of the river near present-day Taft, was named Karlstein after him and with its founding, the original four settlements in "les Allemands" were established. Besides the area being named "les Allemands", the collective name that the settlements were sometimes referred to as was Karlstein, also after Charles Frédérique d'Arensbourg or Karl Friedrich von Arensburg, who was the acknowledged leader of the settlements for more than 55 years.

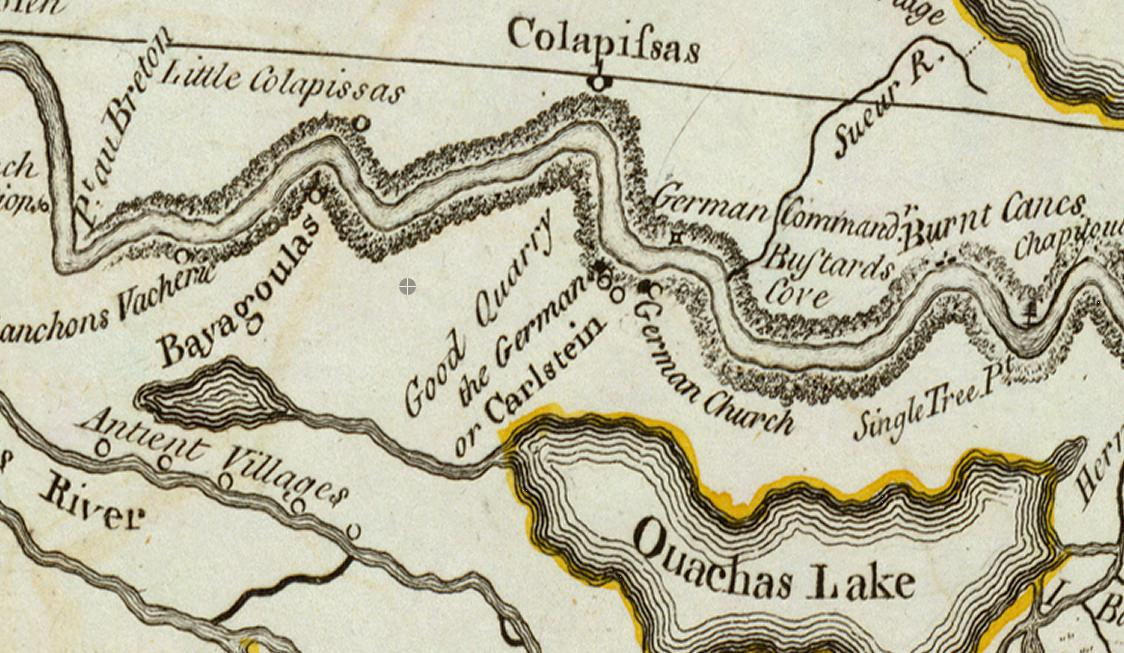
Map of the German Coast, 1775. Carlstein and German Church are located on the westbank of the Mississippi River.

Over time, "les Allemands" would come to be known as Côté des Allemands or German Coast and is located in present-day St. Charles and St. John the Baptist Parishes. The German Coast Settlement established in 1722 was the third permanent settlement in what is now the state of Louisiana, after Natchitoches (1714) and New Orleans (1718).

Also in 1722, the "La Grand Ouragan" Hurricane devastated the German Coast and many Germans considered leaving. In order to prevent this exodus, Governor Bienville decided to grant the settlement of additional lands to settlers on the west bank in addition to the east bank of the river. Later in 1722 and 1723, some French and German settlers along with newly arrived Canadians moved across the Mississippi River to establish the first east bank settlement at L’Anse aux Outardes or Bustard’s Cove. The tributary at this site connected the Mississippi River to Lake Pontchartrain via a previously discovered system of waterways through the LaBranche Wetlands. The ecclesiastical parish and chapel, La Paroisse de St. Jean des Allemands, was also founded in 1723 in Karlstein.

A 1724 census revealed that the German families were not only harvesting enough food and raising enough cattle for their families, but they were bringing their surplus to New Orleans markets. It is apparent from these records that from the beginning of their settlement, German Coast farmers were a major source of food for the city of New Orleans.

The granting of additional lands in 1722 and 1723, led to the founding of the Second German Coast in 1730 and the establishment of officially having settlements on both banks of the Mississippi River. The year 1729 saw the first attack by Native Americans on the German villages. In 1731, as the first decade of settlement on the German Coast ended and the Company of the Indies charter was retrieved by France, Louisiana again became a French colony. The land farmed by settlers on the German Coast technically belonged to the Company of the Indies until France retrieved its charter. After France once again owned the land, more landholders began to petition France for individual ownership of property.

In 1740, the ecclesiastical parish and chapel relocated to the present-day site of the church in Destrehan on the east bank of the Mississippi River. A log cabin structure was built and both the ecclesiastical parish and chapel were renamed St. Charles in honor of St. Charles Borromeo.

The Territory of Louisiana remained under French rule until 1763, when France ceded Louisiana to Spain after losing the Seven Years' War to Great Britain. The French and Indian War was a North American theater of this war. At the beginning of the Spanish colonial period, many Acadians, people of French descent, began arriving in south Louisiana after being expelled by the British from what is now Nova Scotia after the British took over French territory in Canada along with North American territory east of the Mississippi river. The first French Acadian village was established in present-day Wallace in the German Coast. The Germanic settlers of the German Coast and French Acadians of what would become Acadiana thrived alongside each another with French becoming the dominant language. The intermingling and marriage between these two groups and influence from additional groups and cultures led to the formation of what was to become Louisiana Cajun culture.

The early 18th century settlers in the area received land grants from the Spanish or French royal governments, depending upon which country ruled the territory at the time of application. The French style of property allotments was made up of narrow frontage on the river so that each plantation had access to high ground for ground transportation of goods to and from New Orleans and world markets. In addition to ground transportation, goods were mainly shipped by boat on bayous and lakes and also via the Mississippi River. The main house and supporting outbuildings were constructed near the river. The remaining property extended away from the river into the wetlands, where land was cleared for cultivation of sugar cane and indigo. Homes still existing in St. Charles Parish include Destrehan Plantation, Homeplace Plantation House, and Ormond Plantation House. Labranche Plantation no longer exists, but the Creole dependency house, known in French as a garconnière still exists.

=== 19th century ===
In 1800, Napoleon, the First Consul of the French Republic, regained control over Louisiana for France. Following the Louisiana Purchase in 1803, the Territory of Orleans was established in 1804 and the following year on April 10, 1805, it was divided into twelve counties with one of them being the County of the German Coast. The first courthouse was established in 1804, in a community then known as “St. Charles Courthouse". The town was later renamed Hahnville and became the parish seat.

In 1806, the log cabin St. Charles Chapel in Destrehan burned. That same year, a wood-framed church painted red was built at the site of the former chapel. The church became known as the "Little Red Church". It was a famous riverboat landmark where boat captains traditionally paid off their crews.

In 1807, St. Charles Parish was "officially" established. In 1811, part of the German Coast uprising took place in St. Charles Parish. The first two public schools in St. Charles Parish opened in 1850.

In 1863 Abraham Lincoln mentioned St. Charles Parish in the Emancipation Proclamation as a confederate parish.

During the American Civil War, three skirmishes took place in St. Charles Parish. They were the "Battle of Hahnville Courthouse", "Skirmish of Boutte Station" and the "Battle of Des Allemands". Louisiana and therefore St. Charles Parish were part of the Fifth Military District during the Reconstruction era from 1865 to 1877.

Our Lady of the Holy Rosary Catholic Church was originally built in 1877 in Taft.

Towards the end of 19th century, ferry regulation throughout the parish would now be implemented with parish oversight.

=== 20th century ===
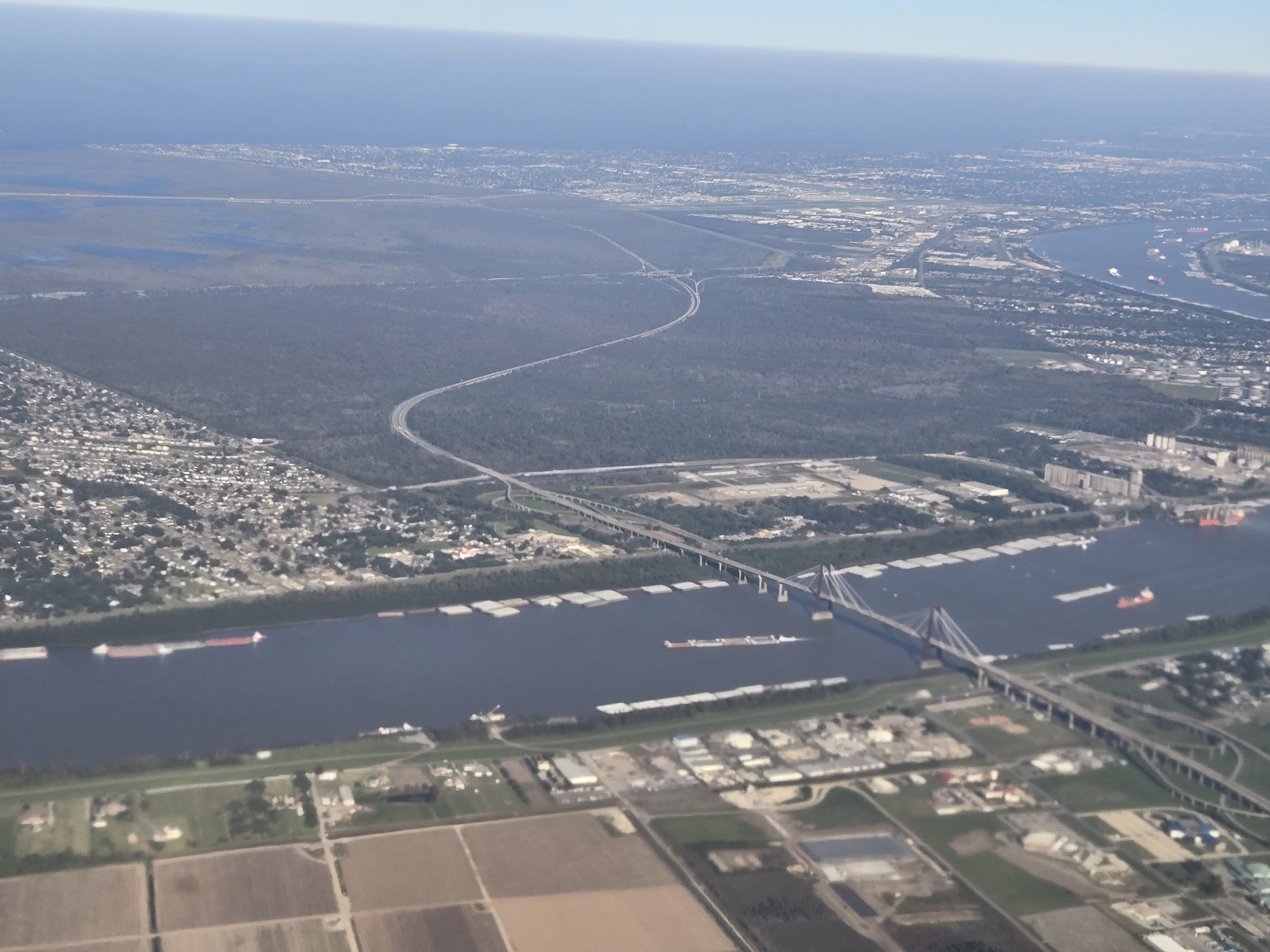
Aerial photograph of St. Charles Parish, Louisiana

Starting in the 20th century, the area of the German Coast and location of the first permanent settlement of Acadians in Louisiana began to be referred to as the "River Parishes". The River Parishes are those parishes in Louisiana between New Orleans and Baton Rouge that span both banks of the Mississippi River, and are part of the larger Acadiana region. Traditionally they are considered to be St. Charles Parish, St. James Parish, and St. John the Baptist Parish.

Industry came to St. Charles Parish in the early 20th century as the energy industry moved to the east bank of the parish to access the Mississippi River, rail and air services. In 1914, land in Destrehan was sold to the Mexican Petroleum Company, which began operating an oil refinery in 1918, marking the first appearance of heavy industry in the parish. In 1916, the New Orleans Refining Company purchased land in what was then Sellers, leading to the town to be renamed Norco. Additional industrial facilities in the energy industry or supporting the industry were built in New Sarpy, Good Hope, and St. Rose.

In 1921, the "Little Red Church" burned and St. Charles Borromeo Church was built on the property that same year with the formal dedication taking place on January 25, 1922.

In 1924, the first public high schools in the parish opened. Destrehan High School opened on the east bank and Hahnville High School opened on the west bank of the parish.

Since the establishment of the German Coast, levees were the responsibility of landowners and breaches in these levees called "crevasses" were always a major concern due to the extensive flooding they caused. Previous crevasses in the areas of Hymelia and Bonnet Carré caused extensive damage to the area. Another crevasse during the Great Mississippi Flood of 1927 between the towns of Montz and LaPlace badly damaged Montz. Flood Control Acts had previously been passed, but because of the size of the devastation in Arkansas, Mississippi and Louisiana, authorization of the Mississippi River and Tributaries Project in the Flood Control Act of 1928 was passed. The act called for the “levees only” policy that failed to be discarded and allowed for improved levees and floodways or "spillways" to be built.

Between 1929 and 1931, the Bonnet Carré Spillway, a flood control structure was built and allows floodwaters from the Mississippi River to flow into Lake Pontchartrain. This site was chosen because four major crevasses had previously occurred at this location.

The first appearance of industry on the west bank came in 1952 when the Lion Oil Company began construction of their facility in Luling. In 1955, Royal Dutch Shell opened the Shell Chemical Plant in Norco after their forerunner, Shell Petroleum Corporation, previously acquired the New Orleans Refining Company oil refinery in 1929.

The 1960s saw a new industry come to St. Charles Parish as grain elevators were built in Ama and Destrehan. Additionally, chemical plants were built in Taft in the 1960s. In 1963, Our Lady of the Holy Rosary Catholic Church moved to Hahnville with the building being completed in 1964.

In 1971, the Louisiana State Legislature officially recognized 22 Louisiana parishes, including St. Charles Parish, and "other parishes of similar cultural environment" for their "strong French Acadian cultural aspects" (House Concurrent Resolution No. 496, June 6, 1971, authored by Carl W. Bauer of St. Mary Parish), and made the "Heart of Acadiana" the official name of the region. The public, however, prefers the one-word place name Acadiana to refer to the region. The official term appears on regional maps and highway markers.

On October 20, 1976, the MV George Prince ferry disaster occurred on the Mississippi River. The Luling–Destrehan Ferry George Prince was struck by the Norwegian tanker SS Frosta. Ninety-six passengers and crew were aboard the ferry when it was struck, and seventy-eight perished. On October 6, 1983, seven-years after the ferry disaster, the Hale Boggs Memorial Bridge opened. The bridge, originally named the Luling–Destrehan Bridge, connected the east bank and west bank of the parish by bridge for the first time. 1983 also saw the end of ferry service in the parish, marking the first time since the 1800s this service was not available.

In 1985, the Louisiana Power and Light Company began operation of the Waterford Nuclear Generating Station on Charles Frédérique d'Arensbourg's original land grant of Karlstein.

=== 21st century ===
On September 5, 2000, the town of Good Hope was annexed by Norco. This was the eventual result of a 1983 buyout of all residential and commercial property by Good Hope Refinery; the town is listed as a ghost town. Also in 2000, Taft had a population of zero residents and is now also listed as a ghost town.

On March 26, 2002, the Davis Pond Freshwater Diversion Project dedication ceremony was held near Luling after construction began on the project in 1997. In 2007, the East Bank Hurricane Protection Levee was completed. The levee protects the majority of the east bank from Lake Pontchartrain and Labranche Wetlands flood waters.

On August 29, 2021, St. Charles Parish was devastated by Hurricane Ida. Parish President Matthew Jewel stated that "Nearly every structure in the parish has damage ranging from cosmetic damage to a total collapse of a home or building."

== Geography ==
According to the U.S. Census Bureau, the parish has a total area of 411 square miles (1,060 km^{2}), of which 279 square miles (720 km^{2}) is land and 132 square miles (340 km^{2}) (32%) is water.

=== Bodies of water ===
- Bayou des Allemands
- Lac des Allemands
- Lake Cataouatche
- Lake Pontchartrain
- Lake Salvador
- Mississippi River

=== National protected area ===
- Bonnet Carré Spillway

=== State protected areas ===
- Salvador Wildlife Management Area
- Timken Wildlife Management Area

=== Adjacent parishes ===
- Jefferson Parish (east)
- Lafourche Parish (southwest)
- St. John the Baptist Parish (northwest)

=== Communities ===
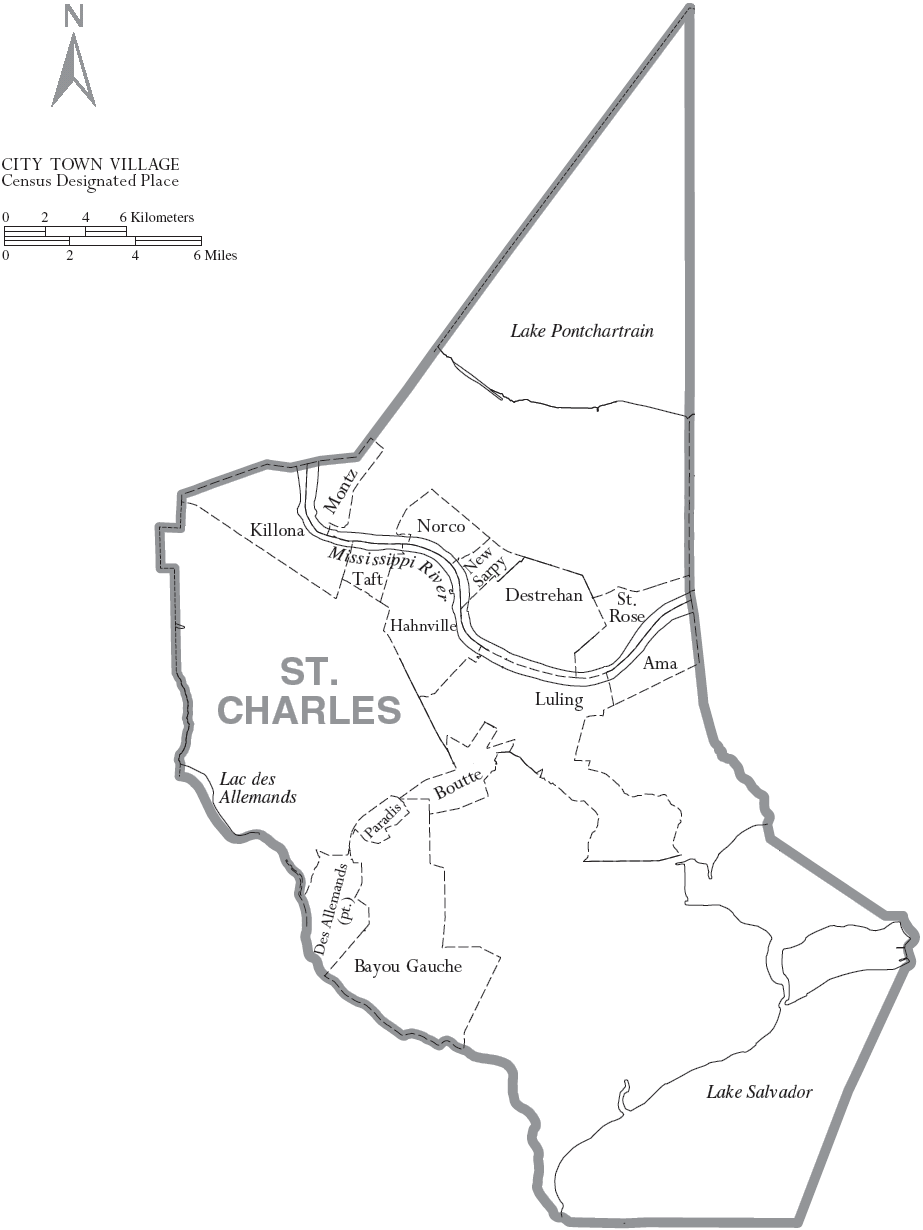
Map of St. Charles Parish, with municipal labels

==== Census-designated places ====
- Ama
- Bayou Gauche
- Boutte
- Des Allemands (partial)
- Destrehan
- Hahnville (parish seat)
- Killona
- Luling
- Montz
- New Sarpy
- Norco
- Paradis
- St. Rose
- Taft

==== Unincorporated communities ====
- Almedia
- Frellsen
- Gypsy‡

‡This populated place also has portions in an adjacent parish or parishes

==== Ghost town ====
- Good Hope

==== Former populated areas ====
- Augsburg
- Hoffen
- Karlstein
- Marienthal

== Demographics ==
Historical population
Census	Pop.	Note	%±
1810	3,291		—
1820	3,862		17.4%
1830	5,147		33.3%
1840	4,700		−8.7%
1850	5,120		8.9%
1860	5,297		3.5%
1870	4,867		−8.1%
1880	7,161		47.1%
1890	7,737		8.0%
1900	9,072		17.3%
1910	11,207		23.5%
1920	8,586		−23.4%
1930	12,111		41.1%
1940	12,321		1.7%
1950	13,363		8.5%
1960	21,219		58.8%
1970	29,550		39.3%
1980	37,259		26.1%
1990	42,437		13.9%
2000	48,072		13.3%
2010	52,780		9.8%
2020	52,549		−0.4%
2025 (est.)	50,586	▼	−3.7%
U.S. Decennial Census; 1790–1960 1900–1990; 1990–2000 2010–2013

St. Charles Parish, Louisiana – Racial and ethnic composition Note: the U.S. Census Bureau treats Hispanic/Latino as an ethnic category. This table excludes Latinos from the racial categories and assigns them to a separate category. Hispanics/Latinos may be of any race.
Race / Ethnicity (NH = Non-Hispanic)	Pop 1980	Pop 1990	Pop 2000	Pop 2010	Pop 2020	% 1980	% 1990	% 2000	% 2010	% 2020
White alone (NH)	26,944	30,913	33,901	34,925	32,708	72.32%	72.84%	70.52%	66.17%	62.24%
Black or African American alone (NH)	9,313	10,164	12,043	13,925	13,024	25.00%	23.95%	25.05%	26.38%	24.78%
Native American or Alaska Native alone (NH)	68	111	119	160	215	0.18%	0.26%	0.25%	0.30%	0.41%
Asian alone (NH)	73	157	265	435	555	0.20%	0.37%	0.55%	0.82%	1.06%
Native Hawaiian or Pacific Islander alone (NH)	x	x	4	18	20	x	x	0.01%	0.03%	0.04%
Other race alone (NH)	38	22	52	57	172	0.10%	0.05%	0.11%	0.11%	0.33%
Mixed race or Multiracial (NH)	x	x	342	612	1,714	x	x	0.71%	1.16%	3.26%
Hispanic or Latino (any race)	823	1,070	1,346	2,648	4,141	2.21%	2.52%	2.80%	5.02%	7.88%
Total	37,259	42,437	48,072	52,780	52,549	100.00%	100.00%	100.00%	100.00%	100.00%

As of the 2020 census, the parish had a population of 52,549, 19,187 households, and 14,463 families residing in it. The median age was 39.0 years, 24.8% of residents were under the age of 18, and 14.7% of residents were 65 years of age or older. For every 100 females there were 95.3 males, and for every 100 females age 18 and over there were 92.4 males age 18 and over.

The racial makeup of the parish was 63.8% White, 25.0% Black or African American, 0.5% American Indian and Alaska Native, 1.1% Asian, <0.1% Native Hawaiian and Pacific Islander, 2.5% from some other race, and 7.0% from two or more races. Hispanic or Latino residents of any race comprised 7.9% of the population.

82.2% of residents lived in urban areas, while 17.8% lived in rural areas.

There were 19,187 households in the parish, of which 37.0% had children under the age of 18 living in them. Of all households, 51.9% were married-couple households, 15.3% were households with a male householder and no spouse or partner present, and 26.5% were households with a female householder and no spouse or partner present. About 21.3% of all households were made up of individuals and 8.8% had someone living alone who was 65 years of age or older.

There were 20,445 housing units, of which 6.2% were vacant. Among occupied housing units, 79.9% were owner-occupied and 20.1% were renter-occupied. The homeowner vacancy rate was 0.7% and the rental vacancy rate was 7.3%.

The 2019 American Community Survey estimated that 7.1% of residents spoke another language other than English at home, with Spanish as the second-most spoken language, and that 3.3% of the population were foreign-born.

The same survey estimated the median housing value was $207,700, the median gross rent was $978, the median household income was $69,019, and 15.1% of the population lived at or below the poverty line. Males had a median income of $43,589 versus $43,022 for females, closing the gender pay gap.

In common with much of southern Louisiana, Christianity through the Roman Catholic Church has been the largest religious group for the parish. Its Catholic population numbered 21,947 at the 2020 study by the Association of Religion Data Archives. Following, Southern Baptists, National Baptists, and Full Gospel Baptists were the largest Protestant groups, though non/inter-denominational Protestantism numbered 1,440.

== Economy ==
St. Charles Parish is part of the River Region Chamber of Commerce's service area, a regional, membership-based business organization founded in 2004 and headquartered in LaPlace, Louisiana. The Chamber supports business networking and regional economic initiatives across the River Parishes.

== Education ==
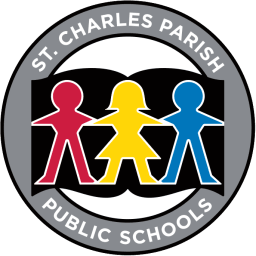
St. Charles Parish Public Schools Logo

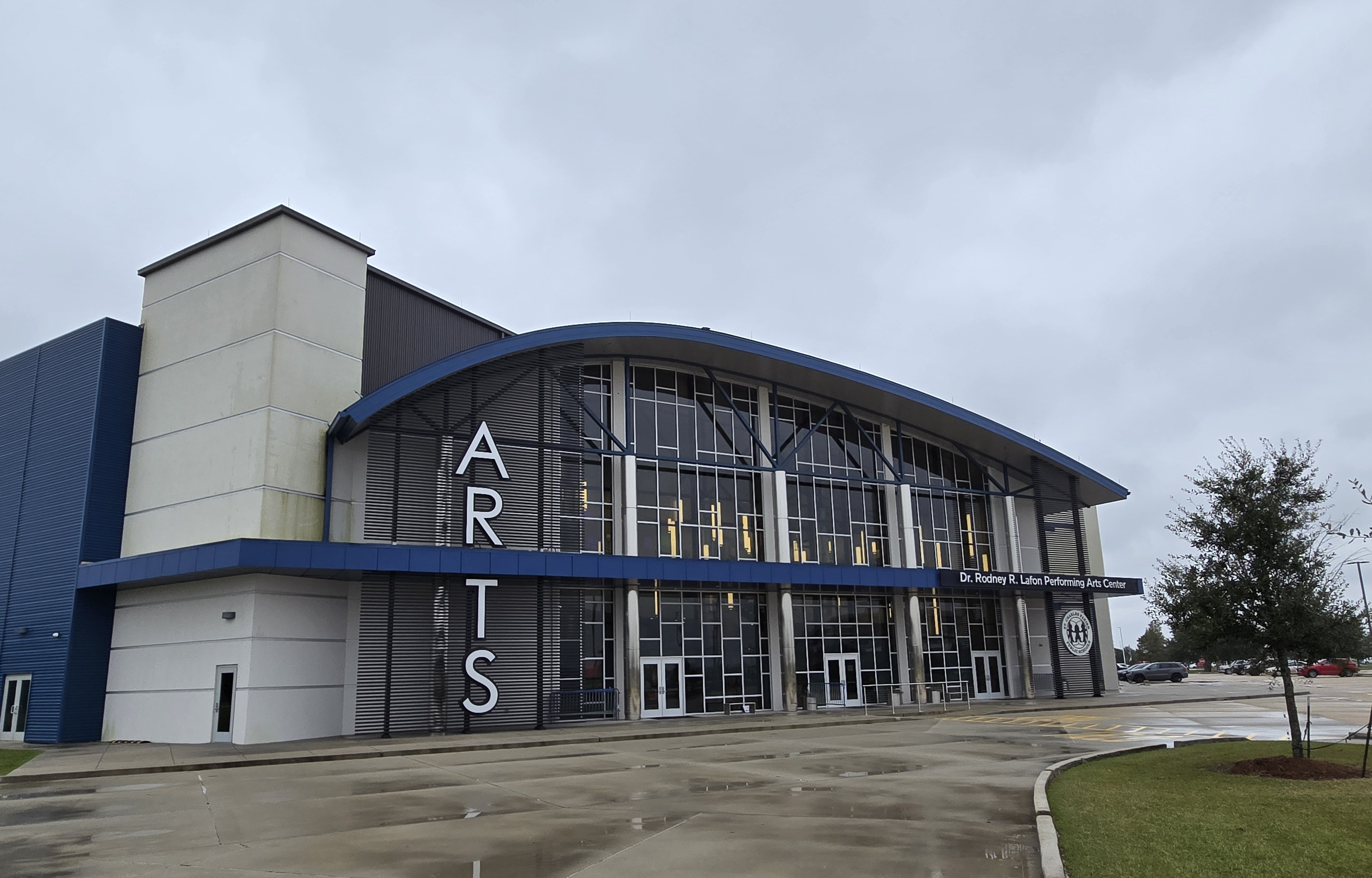
Dr. Rodney R. Lafon Performing Arts Center

=== Primary and secondary education ===
==== Public ====
St. Charles Parish Public Schools operates public schools in St. Charles Parish.

Performing Arts Center

- Dr. Rodney R. Lafon Performing Arts Center

Upper secondary education

- Destrehan High School
- Hahnville High School

==== Private ====
- St. Charles Borromeo School

=== Colleges and universities ===
St. Charles Parish is in the service area of Delgado Community College.

== Sports and recreation ==
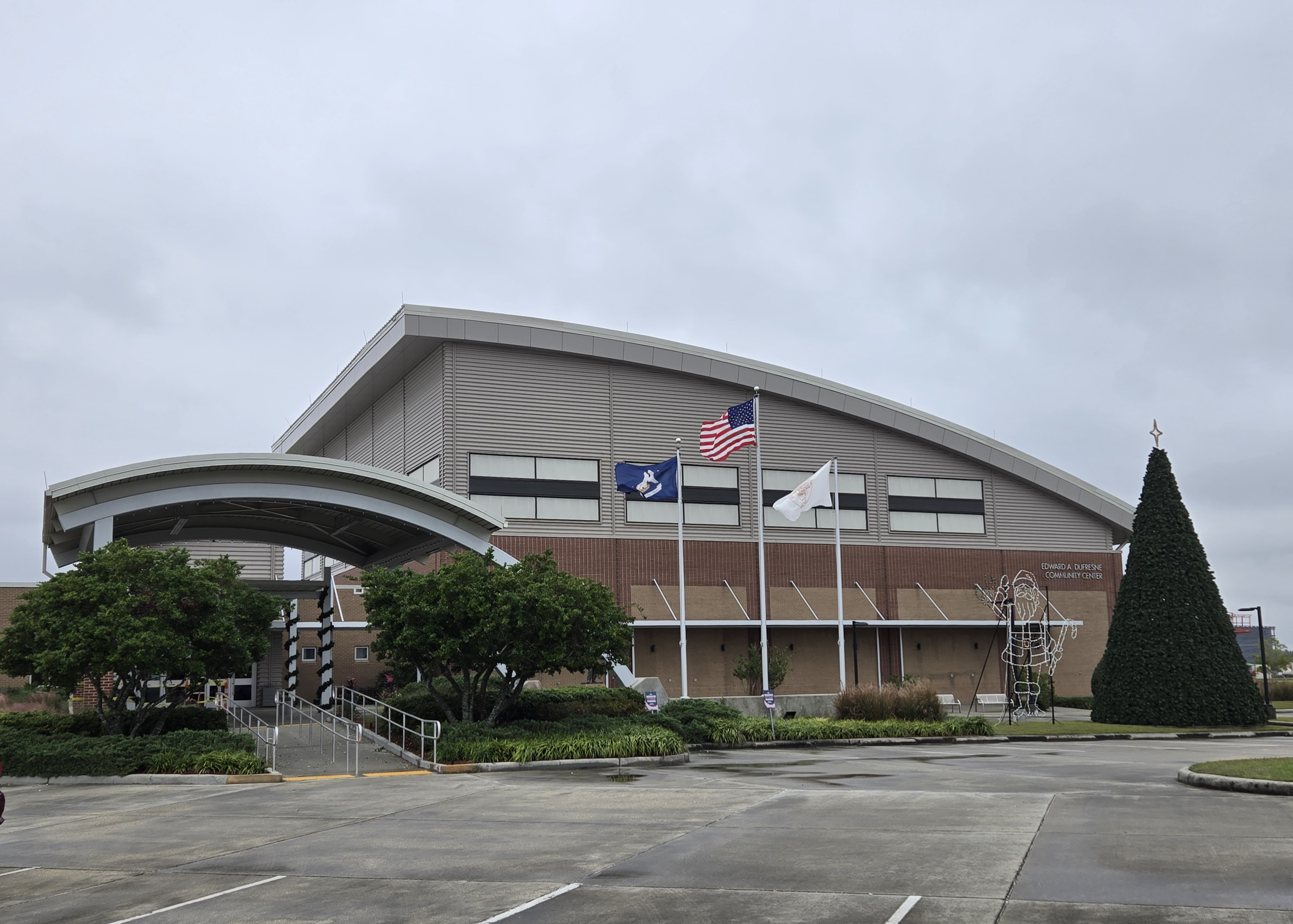
Edward A. Dufresne Community Center

- Edward A. Dufresne Community Center - The Dufresne Community Center is a 30,000-square-foot multi-purpose facility owned and operated by St. Charles Parish. It includes an athletics gym area, meeting room space and offices.
- East Bank Bridge Park - baseball fields, basketball court, softball fields, tennis court and walking track
- West Bank Bridge Park - baseball fields, softball fields, tennis court, volleyball court and walking track

== Media ==
St. Charles Parish Parish is served by New Orleans media sources, such as a local section of The Times-Picayune.

The parish does have a community newspaper, the St. Charles Herald-Guide that was established in 1993. The Herald-Guide newspaper was a merger of the River Parishes Guide that was founded in 1969 and the St. Charles Herald that was founded in 1873 by ex-Louisiana Governor, Michael Hahn with the first issue of the Herald Newspaper being published on February 15, 1873.

== Government ==
St. Charles Parish is governed by an executive branch and legislative branch. The executive branch is headed by the elected Parish President; currently Matthew Jewell.

The legislative branch consists of an elected nine-member council. The parish is divided into seven single-member districts, each of which is represented by an elected district council member. In addition, two at-large seats are elected on a parish-wide basis. The at-large seats are divided into an "A" seat and a "B" seat. The "A" seat representative must be a resident of the parish's east bank while the "B" seat must be held by a resident of the west bank. The last parish council election was in October / November 2019.

The St. Charles Parish Council consists of the following members:

District	Council Member
At-Large Division "A"	Michael A. Mobley
At-Large Division "B"	Holly Fonseca
1	La Sandra Darensbourg Gordon
2	Heather Skiba
3	Walter Pilié
4	Willie Comardelle
5	Michelle O’Daniels
6	Bob Fisher
7	Michele deBruler

== Politics ==
United States presidential election results for St. Charles Parish, Louisiana
Year	Republican		Democratic		Third party(ies)	
Year	No.	%	No.	%	No.	%
1912	28	13.33%	157	74.76%	25	11.90%
1916	30	9.09%	297	90.00%	3	0.91%
1920	92	33.45%	183	66.55%	0	0.00%
1924	132	21.29%	488	78.71%	0	0.00%
1928	108	8.82%	1,116	91.18%	0	0.00%
1932	86	5.66%	1,429	94.08%	4	0.26%
1936	96	6.00%	1,503	94.00%	0	0.00%
1940	153	8.98%	1,550	91.02%	0	0.00%
1944	174	8.21%	1,945	91.79%	0	0.00%
1948	286	11.87%	914	37.93%	1,210	50.21%
1952	1,086	28.84%	2,679	71.16%	0	0.00%
1956	2,417	57.86%	1,671	40.00%	89	2.13%
1960	1,377	20.86%	4,708	71.31%	517	7.83%
1964	2,715	34.81%	5,085	65.19%	0	0.00%
1968	1,675	18.35%	3,070	33.63%	4,383	48.02%
1972	5,469	60.42%	2,788	30.80%	795	8.78%
1976	4,270	37.11%	6,872	59.73%	363	3.16%
1980	6,779	44.83%	7,898	52.23%	446	2.95%
1984	10,185	59.62%	6,784	39.71%	113	0.66%
1988	9,685	53.82%	7,973	44.31%	337	1.87%
1992	9,158	43.87%	8,810	42.20%	2,909	13.93%
1996	9,316	43.55%	10,612	49.61%	1,465	6.85%
2000	11,981	55.70%	8,918	41.46%	611	2.84%
2004	14,747	61.87%	8,856	37.15%	234	0.98%
2008	16,457	64.80%	8,522	33.56%	418	1.65%
2012	15,937	62.91%	8,896	35.12%	500	1.97%
2016	16,621	63.46%	8,559	32.68%	1,012	3.86%
2020	18,233	63.94%	9,800	34.37%	484	1.70%
2024	17,443	65.37%	8,812	33.02%	430	1.61%

== Healthcare and emergency medical services ==
=== Hospital ===
- St. Charles Parish Hospital

== Law ==
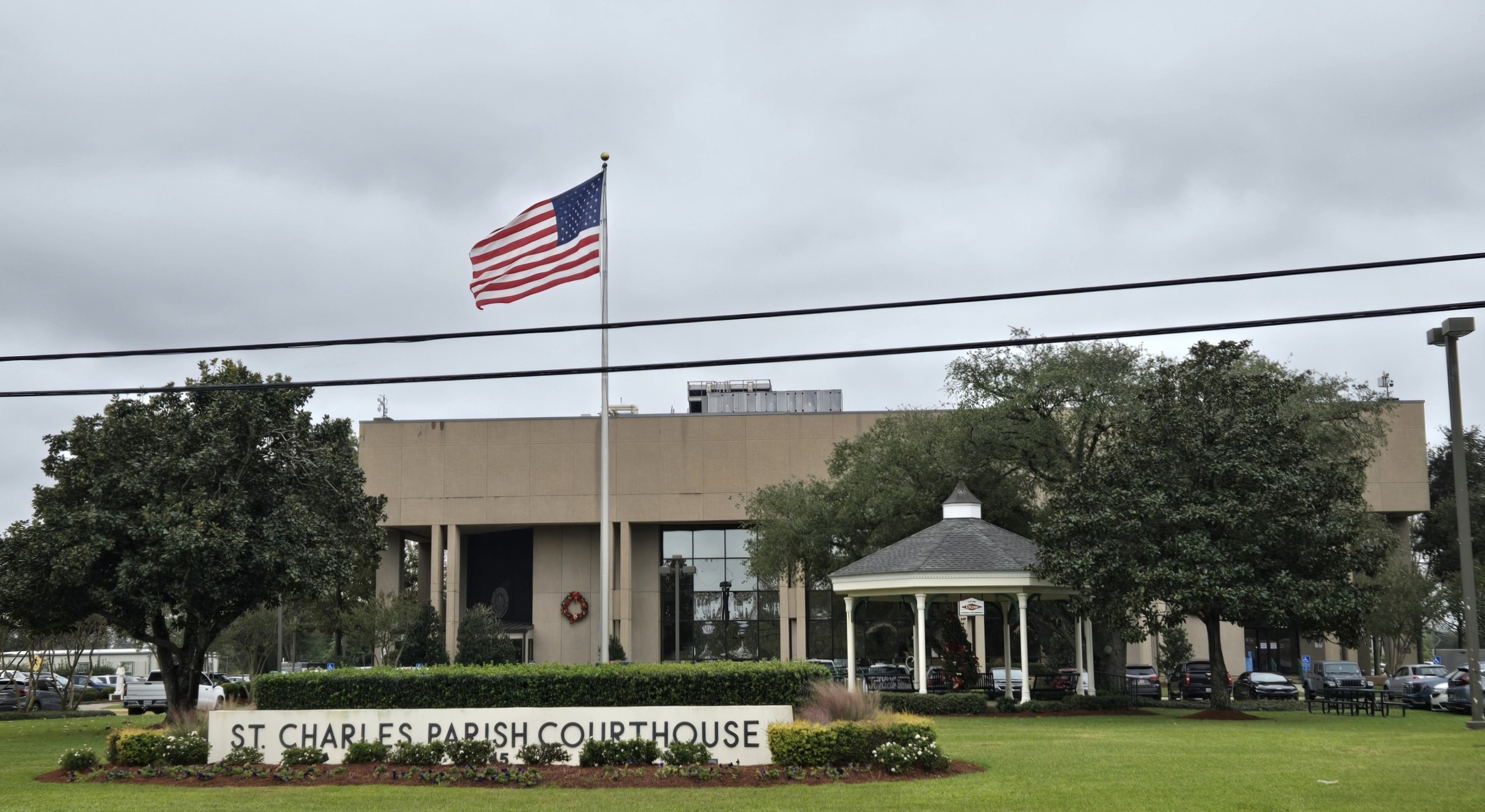
St. Charles Parish Courthouse

As parish seat, Hahnville is the site of the parish courthouse.

=== Judicial district ===
St. Charles Parish comprises the 29th Judicial District, Louisiana.

=== Law enforcement ===
- St. Charles Parish Sheriff's Office

== Transportation ==
=== Airports ===
- Louis Armstrong New Orleans International Airport
- St. Charles Airport

=== Highways and roads ===
==== Interstates ====
- Interstate 10
  - Interstate 310
- Future Interstate 49

==== Major highways ====
- U.S. Highway 61
- U.S. Highway 90
- Louisiana Highway 18
- Louisiana Highway 48
- Louisiana Highway 50
- Louisiana Highway 52
- Louisiana Highway 306
- Louisiana Highway 626
- Louisiana Highway 627
- Louisiana Highway 628
- Louisiana Highway 631
- Louisiana Highway 632
- Louisiana Highway 633
- Louisiana Highway 635
- Louisiana Highway 3060
- Louisiana Highway 3127
- Louisiana Highway 3141
- Louisiana Highway 3142
- Louisiana Highway 3160

==== Major vehicular bridges ====
- Hale Boggs Memorial Bridge
- I-10 Bonnet Carré Spillway Bridge
- LaBranche Wetlands Bridge
- U.S. 61 Bonnet Carré Spillway Bridge

=== Railroads ===
==== Rail ====
- Amtrak
- Canadian National Railway
- Kansas City Southern Railway

==== Major railroad bridges ====
- CNR Bonnet Carré Spillway-Baton Rouge Bridge
- CNR Bonnet Carré Spillway-McComb Bridge
- Kansas City Southern Bonnet Carré Spillway Bridge

== Notable people ==
- Darren Barbier, Luling, former head football coach at Nicholls State University
- Alfred Blue, Boutte, NFL running back
- Paul F. Boudreau, Destrehan, NFL and CFL assistant coach
- David Butler, Good Hope, sculptor and painter
- LaRon Byrd, Hahnville, NFL wide receiver
- Mutt Carey, Hahnville, jazz trumpeter
- Joel T. Chaisson, II, Destrehan, State Senate president from 2008 to 2012 and district attorney
- Macon Clark, St. Rose, NFL safety
- Barbara Colley, Luling, romance and mystery writer
- Charles Frederick d’Arensbourg, leader of the German Coast settlement
- Dana "Pokey" Chatman, Ama, WNBA head coach, former LSU women's basketball coach
- Burnell Dent, St. Rose, NFL linebacker
- Jean Noel Destréhan, Destrehan, U.S. Senator
- Jesse Duplantis, Destrehan, televangelist
- Snooks Eaglin, St. Rose, guitarist and singer
- Roy Ebron, St. Rose, ABA basketball player
- Hoffman Franklin Fuller, Destrehan, professor-emeritus at Tulane University Law School and Bossier City mayor
- Michael Hahn, Hahnville, 19th Governor of Louisiana and U.S. Representative
- Minor Hall, Norco, jazz drummer
- Tubby Hall, Norco, jazz drummer
- Shelley Hennig, St. Rose and Destrehan, actress and Miss Teen USA
- Jordan Jefferson, St. Rose, NFL quarterback
- Justin Jefferson, St. Rose, NFL wide receiver
- Curtis Johnson, St. Rose, head football coach at Tulane University and NFL assistant coach
- Damaris Johnson, Norco, NFL wide receiver
- Jamall Johnson, Norco, NFL linebacker and actor
- Dawan Landry, Ama, NFL safety
- LaRon Landry, Ama, NFL safety
- Sabrina Le Beauf, Ama, actress
- Beulah Levy Ledner, St. Rose, dessert and pastry chef
- Tanner Lee, Destrehan, NFL quarterback
- Mary Ann Vial Lemmon, Hahnville, U.S. federal judge
- Glen Logan, Destrehan, NFL defensive tackle
- Chris Markey, Luling, college and professional running back
- Rondell Mealey, Norco, NFL running back
- Kirk Merritt, Destrehan, NFL wide receiver
- Gregory A. Miller, Norco, attorney in Destrehan and state representative
- Ralph R. Miller, Norco, state representative
- Jerico Nelson, New Sarpy, NFL safety
- George T. Oubre, Norco, state senator
- Jeremy Parquet, Norco, NFL offensive lineman
- Rusty Rebowe, Norco, NFL linebacker
- Tim Rebowe, Norco, head football coach at Nicholls State University
- Ed Reed, St. Rose and Destrehan, NFL safety, member of the Pro Football Hall of Fame
- Darius Reynaud, Luling, NFL wide receiver
- Darryl Richard, St. Rose, NFL defensive lineman
- Garland Robinette, Boutte, journalist and news anchor
- Mike Scifres, Destrehan, NFL punter
- Darrington Sentimore, Norco, NFL defensive lineman
- Gary Smith, Jr., Norco, state senator
- Margaret Taylor-Burroughs, St. Rose, co-founder of the DuSable Museum of African American History
- Gary Tyler, St. Rose, who is believed to have been wrongly convicted of murder in 1974. He was released in 2016.
- Josh Victorian, St. Rose, NFL cornerback
- Darius Vinnett, St. Rose, NFL cornerback
- Devon Walker, Destrehan, Tulane and NFL safety
- Michael Young Jr., St. Rose, NFL wide receiver

== See also ==
- Acadiana
- Bonnet Carré Spillway
- German Coast
  - 1811 German Coast uprising, largest slave rebellion in U.S. history
- Hale Boggs Memorial Bridge
- National Register of Historic Places listings in St. Charles Parish, Louisiana
- New Orleans-Metairie-Hammond, LA-MS CSA
- New Orleans metropolitan area
- River Parishes
