= Lac des Allemands =

Lake in St. John the Baptist Parish, Louisiana, United States

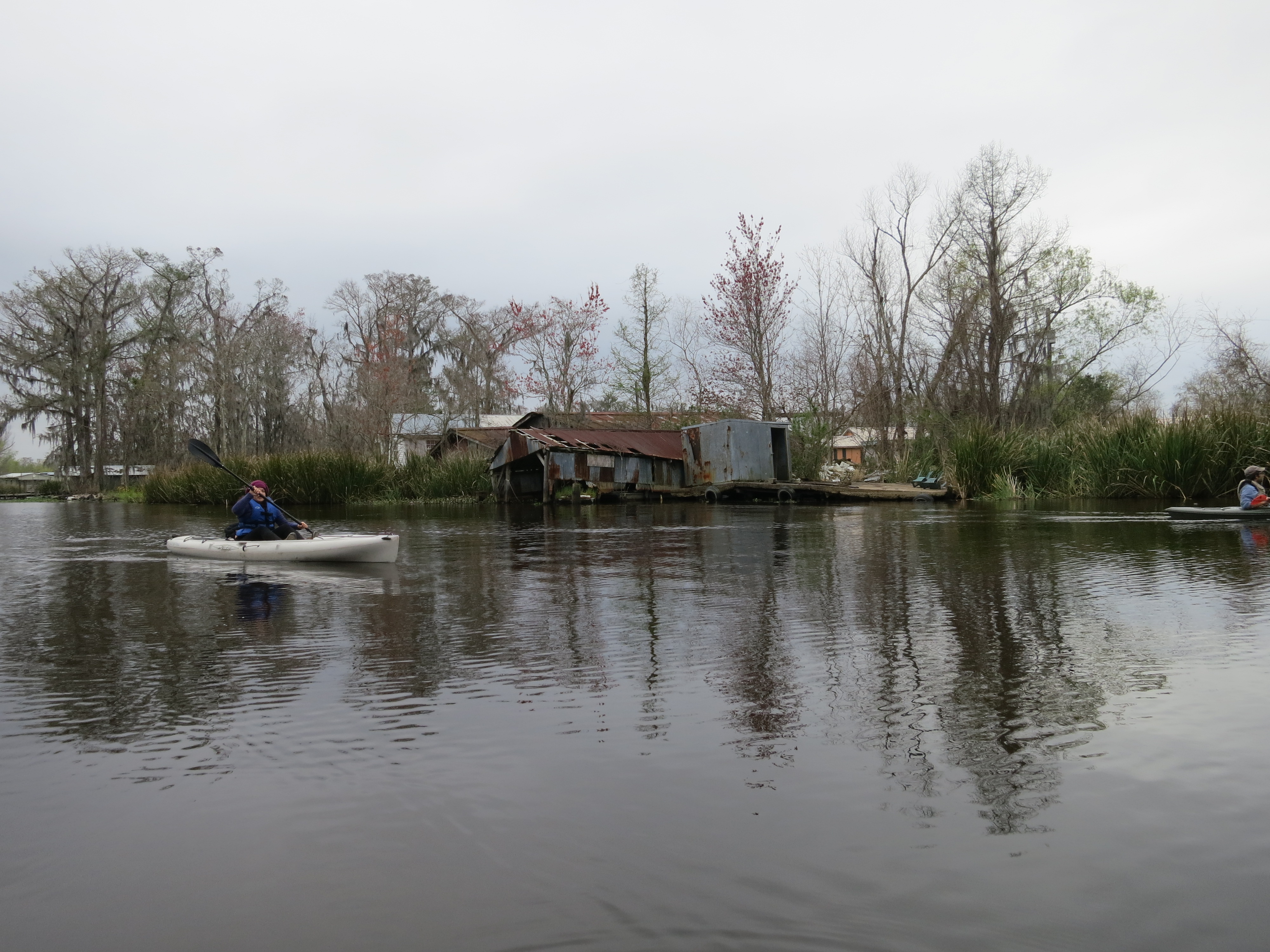

- Location within Louisiana Location within the United States
- Location: Lafourche / St. Charles / St. John the Baptist parishes, Louisiana, United States
- Coordinates: 29°55′N 90°34′W
- Basin countries: United States
- Max. length: 5.5 mi (8.9 km)
- Max. width: 6.5 mi (10.5 km)
- Surface area: 12,000 acres (49 km^{2})
- Average depth: 5 ft (1.5 m)
- Max. depth: 10 ft (3.0 m)
- Surface elevation: Sea level

Lac des Allemands is a 12,000-acre (4,900 ha) lake located about 25 miles (40 km) southwest of New Orleans, Louisiana, in Lafourche, St. Charles, and St. John the Baptist Parishes. The lake name is French for "Lake of the Germans", referring to the early settlers who inhabited that part of Louisiana. St. Charles Parish and St. John the Baptist Parish are part of a region called the German Coast.

Lac des Allemands is a shallow lake, with a maximum depth of 10 feet (3.0 m) and an average depth of about 5 feet (1.5 m). It is mostly located at sea level and measures about 5.5 miles (8.9 km) long and 6.5 miles (10.5 km) wide. The lake is fed by bayous in the Barataria Basin including Grand Bayou and Bayou Chevreuil. Its waters flow southeast into Bayou des Allemands, then into Lake Salvador and eventually the Gulf of Mexico. Lac des Allemands is surrounded by cypress swamp and the bayous and canals offer a habitat for catfish, bass, bream, crappie and panfish. Three species of catfish (flathead, channel, and blue) spawn in the lake from May through September.

The community of Des Allemands is located southeast of the lake on Bayou des Allemands. In 1975, Governor Edwin Edwards declared Des Allemands the "Catfish Capital of the World" and the Louisiana State Legislature named it the "Catfish Capital of the Universe". Each July, Des Allemands hosts the Louisiana Catfish Festival. The name "Catfish Capital of the World" was challenged by another place that claimed the title, so Des Allemands was renamed to Catfish Capital of the Universe.

== See also ==
- List of lakes of the United States
