= Taft, Louisiana =

Taft
- Census-designated place
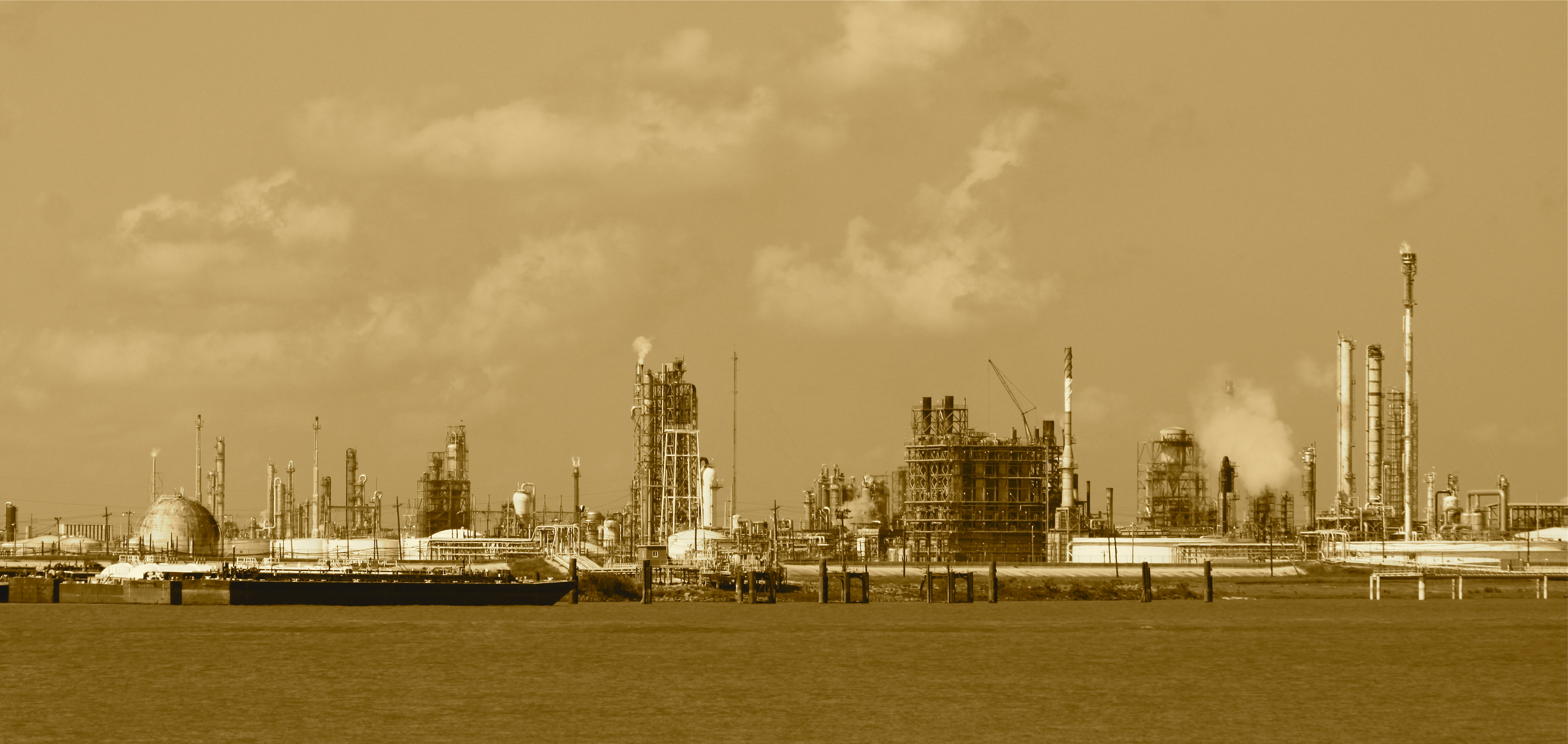
- The Dow Chemical plant in Taft, photographed in 2012

- Location of Taft in Louisiana
- Coordinates: 29°59′29″N 90°26′53″W
- Country: United States
- State: Louisiana
- Parish: St. Charles

Area
  - Total: 5.64 sq mi (14.60 km^{2})
  - Land: 4.98 sq mi (12.90 km^{2})
  - Water: 0.66 sq mi (1.70 km^{2})
- Elevation: 7 ft (2.1 m)

Population (2020)
  - Total: 61
  - Density: 12.3/sq mi (4.73/km^{2})
- Time zone: UTC-6 (CST)
  - Summer (DST): UTC-5 (CDT)
- Area code: 985
- FIPS code: 22-74550
- GNIS feature ID: 2402911

Taft is a census-designated place (CDP) in St. Charles Parish, Louisiana, United States, located on the west bank of the Mississippi River. As of the 2020 census, Taft had a population of 61.

The community is part of the industrial corridor along the Mississippi River between New Orleans and Baton Rouge. Taft is the location of the Dow St. Charles Operations chemical complex, part of the Waterford Nuclear Generating Station, and other industrial facilities.

== History ==
Taft developed as a small river community in St. Charles Parish. The Taft post office opened June 7, 1905, when the population was estimated at 700. Louis A. Barre was the first postmaster. The post office closed August 11, 1967, and mail service was transferred to Hahnville. By 1977, Taft had 10 homes and 36 residents.

Taft was the original site of Our Lady of the Holy Rosary Catholic Church, which served Taft, Killona and Hahnville. The church was built in 1877 and moved to Hahnville in 1963. The cemetery remained in Taft and continued to be used as a burial ground by the church. It is bounded on three sides by Dow chemical facilities.

In the 20th century, Taft became defined by industrial development along the river. The area includes a phosphate processing facility associated with The Mosaic Company and its predecessor IMC-Agrico, the Dow/Union Carbide Taft/Star petrochemical complex, and part of the Waterford power station site.

== Industry ==
Taft is the location of the Dow St. Charles Operations complex. Dow describes its Louisiana operations as home to 15 production units that make more than 200 products used in cosmetics, detergents, solvents, pharmaceuticals, adhesives, plastics, packaging, automotive parts and electronic components. A Dow fact sheet for St. Charles Operations lists products and end uses including plastics, insecticides, films and fabrics, antifreeze, jet fuel, brake fluid, paints, adhesives, textiles, lubricants, pharmaceuticals, medical supplies, personal care products, toothpaste and shampoos.

The Dow/Union Carbide Taft/Star petrochemical plant has produced organic chemicals including acrolein, acrylic acid and acetaldehyde. Union Carbide, a subsidiary of Dow, operates a chemical manufacturing facility at 355 Louisiana Highway 3142 in the Taft/Hahnville area.

Taft has also been associated with phosphate fertilizer production. IMC-Agrico announced in January 2001 that it would indefinitely shut down phosphate fertilizer production at its Louisiana plants, including operations tied to Taft. Mosaic later described its Louisiana phosphate operations as including an Uncle Sam plant that produced phosphoric acid and a nearby Faustina plant that produced diammonium phosphate and monoammonium phosphate.

Virtually all of Taft's land is zoned as heavy industrial.

== Waterford Nuclear Generating Station ==
Part of the Waterford Nuclear Generating Station is located in the Taft area. The Nuclear Regulatory Commission identifies Waterford Steam Electric Station, Unit 3, as a pressurized water reactor operated by Entergy Operations Inc. at Killona, about 25 miles (40 km) west of New Orleans. Entergy identifies Waterford 3 as being in Killona and says the station serves Louisiana's electric power needs.

Entergy emergency planning materials for Waterford 3 list Taft among the St. Charles Parish communities in the station's emergency planning area.

== 1982 Union Carbide explosion ==
In December 1982, an explosion occurred at the Union Carbide facility near Taft, about 30 miles (48 km) from New Orleans. A federal case study of the incident reported that the explosion led to the evacuation of nearly 17,000 people. The New York Times reported that about 20,000 people fled the area after the blast.

The federal study examined evacuation behavior following the chemical tank explosion, including the movement of residents and the role of emergency response information during the incident.

== Geography ==
Taft is on the west bank of the Mississippi River in St. Charles Parish. The CDP is across the river from Norco and Montz and near Hahnville and Killona. It is part of the river corridor where petrochemical plants, power generation facilities and other industrial sites are located along the Mississippi River.

According to the United States Census Bureau, the CDP has a total area of 5.64 square miles (14.6 km^{2}), of which 4.98 square miles (12.9 km^{2}) is land and 0.66 square miles (1.7 km^{2}) is water.

== Demographics ==
Historical population
Census	Pop.	Note	%±
2000	0		—
2010	63		—
2020	61		−3.2%
U.S. Decennial Census; 2000 2010 2020

Taft was first listed as a census-designated place in the 2000 United States census. The CDP first appeared with a population of zero in 2000. Its population was 63 in 2010 and 61 in 2020.

Taft CDP, Louisiana – Racial and ethnic composition Note: the U.S. Census Bureau treats Hispanic/Latino as an ethnic category. This table excludes Latinos from the racial categories and assigns them to a separate category. Hispanics/Latinos may be of any race.
Race / Ethnicity (NH = Non-Hispanic)	Pop 2000	Pop 2010	Pop 2020	% 2000	% 2010	% 2020
White alone (NH)	0	61	50	0.00%	96.83%	81.97%
Black or African American alone (NH)	0	0	2	0.00%	0.00%	3.28%
Native American or Alaska Native alone (NH)	0	0	1	0.00%	0.00%	1.64%
Asian alone (NH)	0	0	0	0.00%	0.00%	0.00%
Pacific Islander alone (NH)	0	0	0	0.00%	0.00%	0.00%
Some Other Race alone (NH)	0	0	0	0.00%	0.00%	0.00%
Mixed Race or Multi-Racial (NH)	0	0	4	0.00%	0.00%	6.56%
Hispanic or Latino (any race)	0	2	4	0.00%	3.17%	6.56%
Total	0	63	61	100.00%	100.00%	100.00%
