= Gypsy, Louisiana =

Unincorporated community in Louisiana

- Unincorporated community
- Location within Louisiana Location within the United States
- Coordinates: 30°01′55″N 90°28′03″W
- Country: United States
- State: Louisiana
- Parish: St. John the Baptist
- Elevation: 13 ft (4.0 m)
- Time zone: UTC-6 (Central (CST))
  - Summer (DST): UTC-5 (CDT)
- ZIP code: 70068
- Area code: 985
- GNIS feature ID: 560923
- FIPS code: 22-32350

Gypsy is an unincorporated community in St. John the Baptist and St. Charles parishes, in the U.S. state of Louisiana, located on the east bank of the Mississippi River.

== History ==
Gypsy took its name from Gypsy Plantation, a private estate, which in turn was likely named for the Romani entertainers who would come to river towns looking for work.
