= Lake Cataouatche =

Lake in Louisiana, United States

- Location within Louisiana Location within the United States
- Location: St. Charles/Jefferson parishes, Louisiana, US
- Coordinates: 29°50′30″N 90°13′58″W
- Basin countries: United States
- Max. length: 6 miles (9.7 km)
- Max. width: 4 miles (6.4 km)
- Surface area: 9,280 acres (3,760 ha)
- Average depth: 6 ft (1.8 m)
- Surface elevation: 0 ft (0 m)

Lake Cataouatche is a 9,280-acre (3,760 ha) lake located southwest of New Orleans, Louisiana in St. Charles and Jefferson Parishes. Lake Cataouatche is connected to Lake Salvador to the south by Bayou Couba and Bayou Bardeaux.

In 2011 during Bassmaster Classic XLI, Kevin VanDam fished the lake on the final day of the tournament. He caught bass totaling almost 29 pounds, enabling him to win the tournament with a three-day total weight of 69 pounds, 11 ounces.

== Controversy ==
At the time of the Bassmaster Classic XLI the lake had a reported 98% coverage of the invasive species hydrilla. While considered an aquatic invasive species the plant contributed habitat (grass beds) for bass and the area fishing industry. A new diversion canal was opened to allow water from the Mississippi River to be channeled into the 6-mile (9.7 km) long by 4-mile (6.4 km) wide lake without going through any sediment ponds. This has been controversial as the water remains muddy and the plant needs sunlight. The LDWF spraying of the plants was also to blame but the departments stated they only sprayed boating paths once because there were complaints. Bass fishing has seen an increase in Lake Salvador since grass has started growing there.

== See also ==
- List of lakes of the United States
