= Almedia, Louisiana =

Almedia
- Unincorporated community
- Location of Almedia in Louisiana
- Coordinates: 29°58′25″N 90°18′02″W
- Country: United States
- State: Louisiana
- Parish: St. Charles
- Time zone: UTC-6 (CST)
  - Summer (DST): UTC-5 (CDT)
- Area code: 985

Almedia is an unincorporated community in St. Charles Parish, Louisiana, United States.
