= Frellsen, Louisiana =

Frellsen
- Unincorporated community
- Location of Frellsen in Louisiana
- Coordinates: 29°58′14″N 90°17′24″W
- Country: United States
- State: Louisiana
- Parish: St. Charles
- Elevation: 7 ft (2.1 m)
- Time zone: UTC-6 (CST)
  - Summer (DST): UTC-5 (CDT)
- Area code: 985

Frellsen is an unincorporated community in St. Charles Parish, Louisiana, United States.
