= Killona, Louisiana =

Killona
- Census-designated place
- Location of Killona in Louisiana
- Coordinates: 29°59′58″N 90°29′13″W
- Country: United States
- State: Louisiana
- Parish: St. Charles

Area
  - Total: 0.88 sq mi (2.28 km^{2})
  - Land: 0.80 sq mi (2.06 km^{2})
  - Water: 0.081 sq mi (0.21 km^{2})
- Elevation: 7 ft (2.1 m)

Population (2020)
  - Total: 724
  - Density: 908.1/sq mi (350.61/km^{2})
- Time zone: UTC-6 (CST)
  - Summer (DST): UTC-5 (CDT)
- Area code: 985
- FIPS code: 22-39720
- GNIS feature ID: 2403174

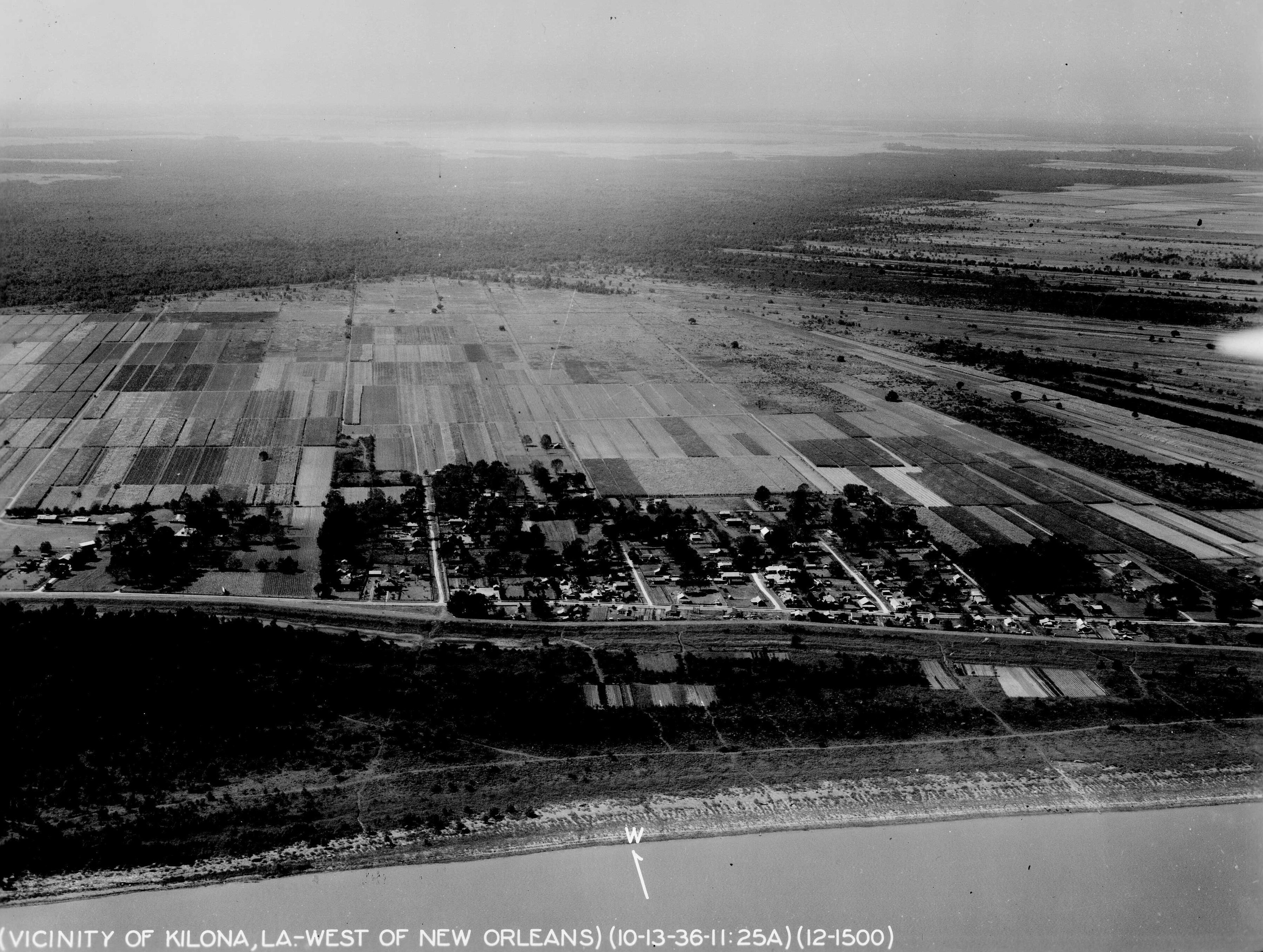
Killona in the 1930s

Killona is a census-designated place (CDP) in St. Charles Parish, Louisiana, United States. The population was 724 in 2020. On December 14, 2022, the town was hit by a destructive and deadly EF2 tornado that damaged or destroyed numerous structures, killed one person, and injured eight others.

== Geography ==
Killona is located at 29°59′58″N 90°29′13″W (29.999471, -90.487081).

According to the United States Census Bureau, the CDP has a total area of 9.3 square miles (24 km^{2}), of which 8.5 square miles (22 km^{2}) is land and 0.9 square miles (2.3 km^{2}) (9.13%) is water.

== Demographics ==
Historical population
Census	Pop.	Note	%±
2000	797		—
2010	793		−0.5%
2020	724		−8.7%
U.S. Decennial Census; 2000 2010 2020

Killona was first listed as a census designated place in the 2000 U.S. census.

Killona CDP, Louisiana – Racial and ethnic composition Note: the U.S. Census Bureau treats Hispanic/Latino as an ethnic category. This table excludes Latinos from the racial categories and assigns them to a separate category. Hispanics/Latinos may be of any race.
Race / Ethnicity (NH = Non-Hispanic)	Pop 2000	Pop 2010	Pop 2020	% 2000	% 2010	% 2020
White alone (NH)	58	11	5	7.28%	1.39%	0.69%
Black or African American alone (NH)	728	774	711	91.34%	97.60%	98.20%
Native American or Alaska Native alone (NH)	0	0	0	0.00%	0.00%	0.00%
Asian alone (NH)	0	0	1	0.00%	0.00%	0.14%
Native Hawaiian or Pacific Islander alone (NH)	0	0	0	0.00%	0.00%	0.00%
Other race alone (NH)	6	0	0	0.75%	0.00%	0.00%
Mixed race or Multiracial (NH)	0	6	6	0.00%	0.76%	0.83%
Hispanic or Latino (any race)	5	2	1	0.63%	0.25%	0.14%
Total	797	793	724	100.00%	100.00%	100.00%

In 2000, Killona's population was 797. By the 2020 census, its population declined to 724.

== Education ==
St. Charles Parish Public School System operates public schools:

- Hahnville High School in Boutte

== Places of interest ==
Killona is home to the following:

- Killona Plantation — Former plantation that held enslaved Africans, after emancipation Black Americans were held there in 'peonage' until 1970s.
- Waterford 3 — Operated by Entergy Nuclear, Waterford Nuclear Generating Station (aka Waterford 3), produces roughly 10% of power for the state of Louisiana.
