= Charles Frederick d'Arensbourg =

German-Swedish settler in Louisiana (1693–1777)

Charles Frederick d’Arensbourg
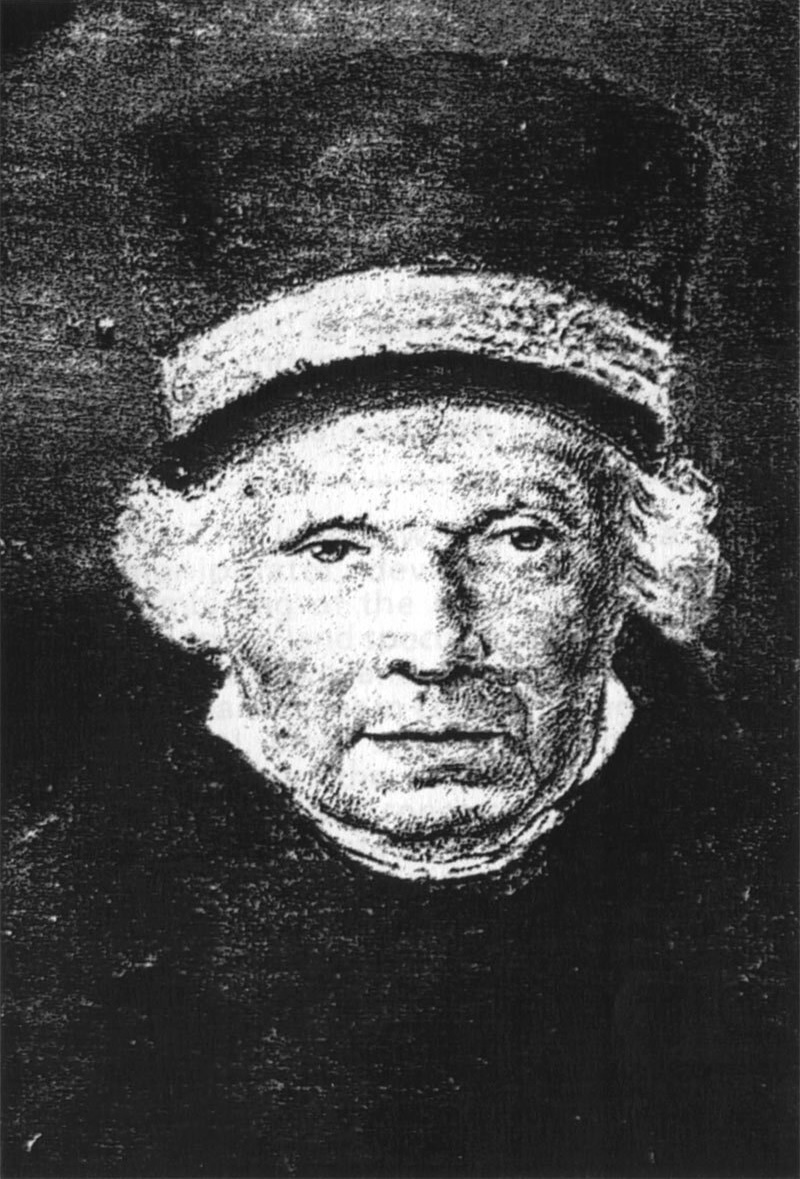

Personal details
- Born: January 1693 Pomerania, Swedish Empire
- Died: 1777 (aged 83–84) German Coast, Louisiana
- Spouse: Margaret Metzer
- Children: 8
- Awards: Order of Saint Louis

Military service
- Allegiance: Sweden; Louisiana
- Branch/service: Swedish Army; German Coast Militia
- Rank: Commandant
- Battles/wars: Great Northern War; Battle of Poltava; Rebellion of 1768

Charles Frederic d’Arensbourg (sometimes written D’Arensbourg or Darensbourg) (1693–1777), born Carl Friedrich Arensburg, was an early leader in the settlement of the German Coast region of Louisiana.

== Early life ==
Carl Friedrich Arensburg was born in 1693 in Stettin, Swedish Pomerania, to ethnically German parents, and baptized on 25 January 1694. His father, Johann Leonhard Arensburg, was master of the Royal Mint, while his mother, Elisabeth Eleonora Formandt-Manderstrom, came from a family that had been ennobled in 1703. He served as an officer in the army of Charles XII of Sweden, and fought at the Battle of Poltava. King Charles XII presented him with an inscribed sword in thanks to his military service.

After the war, Carl moved to France from his home in Arensburg after it was invaded by Russia. He later took service with John Law's Mississippi Company, after being attracted by the prospect of fortune in the new world. While applying to the French for his colonial concession, he signed his name as the more French sounding Charles Frederick d’Arensbourg. Sailing out from the Port of Lorient, Charles landed in Biloxi on 4 June 1721 aboard the Portefaix and accompanied by about thirty other Swedish officers and hundreds of German families.

== German Coast Settlement ==
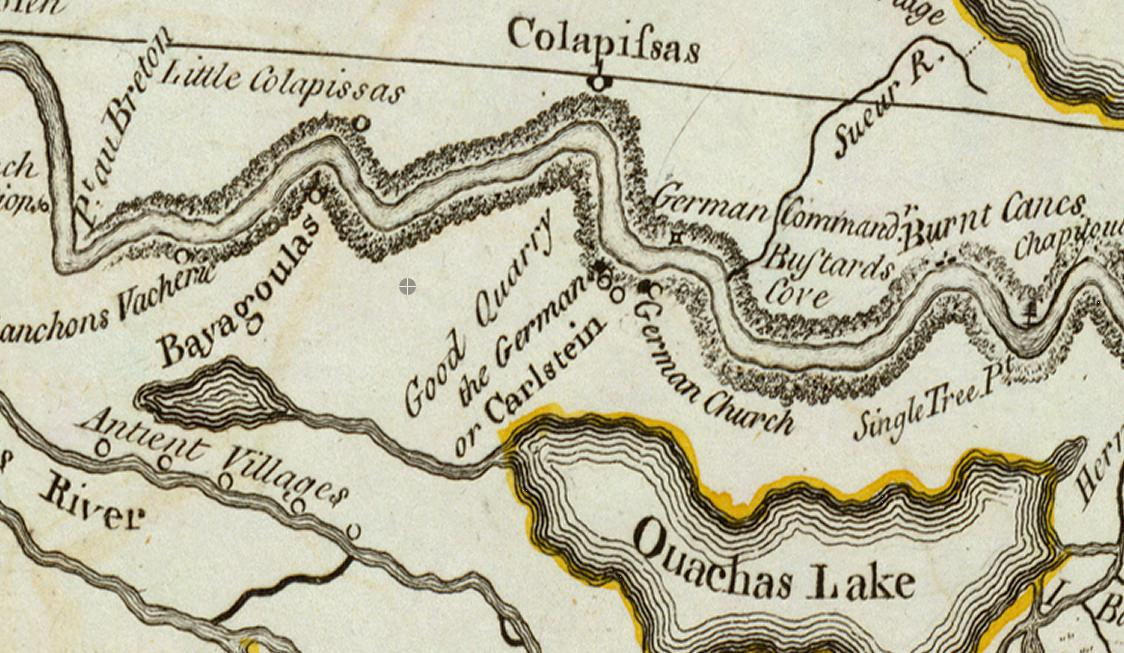
18th century map of the area where Germans settled along the Mississippi River (in present-day St. Charles Parish) in 1721. Carlstein is located at the Mississippi River, north of Ouachas Lake.

By the time the German settlers had arrived in New France, many had died from disease. Originally assigned to lead the people to establish a settlement in what is now Arkansas, Charles abandoned this plan as the Mississippi Company had left them undersupplied and without food, shelter or transport. He instead led the settlers to New Orleans where he befriended Governor Bienville. He had tried to secure passage back to France, but Bienville convinced Charles to instead settle in the fertile lands west of New Orleans. The Germans were given government land grants along the Mississippi River, divided into four areas (Karlstein, Hoffen, Mariental, and Augsburg). D’Arensbourg grant, the largest, was named Karlstein in his honor. With the help of a team of 80 lumberjacks, carpenters and other workers provided by The Mississippi Company, the German settlers built three European styled villages in the area.

He settled on a plantation within the concession and married a fellow German settler, Margaret Metzer. Despite setbacks, the German colony soon prospered and became key in supplying food to nearby New Orleans. Charles remained in Louisiana the rest of his life, leading the German settler community for more than fifty years, both as a civilian and military leader. He was made a Chevalier de St. Louis in 1765. Many of the German colonists were displeased with the new Spanish colonial governor Ulloa, and when the 1768 rebellion took place, d’Arensbourg organized a militia and marched them into New Orleans to assist the rebels. Ulloa soon abandoned the colony, but when Spanish forces returned, the rebellion leaders were arrested and executed. Despite being charged with treason by the Spanish, d’Arensbourg escaped execution though sentenced to death, due to his age. He died in 1777, at the age of 84, having been predeceased by his wife the year before.

== Sources ==
- Seebold, Herman de Bachelle (1941). Old Louisiana Plantation Homes and Family Trees. ISBN 9781455609895.
- Arthur, Stanley Clisby (June 2009). Old Families of Louisiana. ISBN 9780806346885.
- "German Settlers in Louisiana and New Orleans". The Historic New Orleans Collection.
