= Waterford Nuclear Generating Station =

Nuclear power plant in Louisiana, US

- Official name: Waterford Steam Electric Station
- Country: United States
- Location: Killona, St. Charles Parish, Louisiana
- Coordinates: 29°59′43″N 90°28′16″W
- Status: Operational
- Construction began: November 14, 1974
- Commission date: September 24, 1985
- Construction cost: $5.476 billion (2007 USD)
- Owner: Entergy Louisiana
- Operator: Entergy Nuclear

Nuclear power station
- Reactor type: PWR
- Reactor supplier: Combustion Engineering
- Cooling source: Mississippi River
- Thermal capacity: 1 × 3716 MW_{th}

Power generation
- Units operational: 1 × 1152 MW
- Make and model: CE 2-loop (DRYAMB)
- Nameplate capacity: 1152 MW
- Capacity factor: 97.17% (2021); 87.10% (lifetime)
- Annual net output: 9806 GWh (2021)

External links
- Website: Waterford 3

The Waterford Steam Electric Station, Unit 3, also known as Waterford 3, is a nuclear power plant located on a 3,000-acre (1,200 ha) plot in Killona, Louisiana, in St. Charles Parish, about 25 miles (40 km) west of New Orleans.

This plant has one Combustion Engineering two-loop pressurized water reactor. The plant has a maximum dependable capacity of 1,152 megawatts of electricity. The power station's main generator is rated at 1333.2 MVA at a 0.9 power factor (60 psi hydrogen pressure). In 2005, the plant was approved for a 8% (275 MWt) power uprate. The post-uprate nominal main generator output was rated at 1231 MW.

The reactor has a dry ambient pressure containment building.

On August 28, 2005, Waterford shut down due to Hurricane Katrina approaching and declared an unusual event, the least-serious of a four-level emergency classification scale. Shortly after Katrina, Waterford restarted and resumed normal operation.

During the 2011 Mississippi River floods, the plant was shut down briefly after a refueling shutdown on April 6, but was restarted on May 12.

The plant shut down on October 17, 2012, for steam-generator replacement. The plant returned to full power in the middle of January 2013.

The plant shut down on August 28, 2021 in preparation for Hurricane Ida. On August 29, 2021 the plant declared an “unusual event″ — its lowest level of emergency — after the facility lost offsite electrical power.

The plant shut down for on May 5th, 2025 to replace all three of its low pressure turbines as well as its 26th Refuel. The plant returned to power on June 10th of 2025.

== Ownership ==
Waterford is operated by Entergy Nuclear and is owned by Entergy Louisiana, Inc.

== Electricity production ==
Generation (MWh) of Waterford Nuclear Generating Station
Year	Jan	Feb	Mar	Apr	May	Jun	Jul	Aug	Sep	Oct	Nov	Dec	Annual (Total)
2001	825,336	689,268	818,414	791,087	816,595	764,044	807,729	805,583	781,361	819,331	794,604	822,578	9,535,930
2002	821,080	742,181	546,957	297,445	797,447	792,448	808,278	809,052	783,135	821,134	795,559	823,094	8,837,810
2003	824,209	622,223	823,379	793,531	815,749	789,996	813,381	809,434	766,163	399,252	202,766	824,870	8,484,953
2004	824,211	751,332	820,120	797,134	821,172	791,320	812,659	810,523	785,695	820,605	795,478	823,686	9,653,935
2005	823,916	738,692	819,643	418,267	-8,181	490,777	858,075	764,470	465,563	863,302	758,507	874,635	7,867,666
2006	876,778	791,408	874,912	848,394	873,949	837,494	857,255	840,281	825,074	863,264	699,254	81,851	9,269,914
2007	873,838	790,494	874,510	850,120	876,268	846,647	873,150	865,538	842,467	461,856	855,618	882,497	9,893,003
2008	883,274	827,583	882,461	735,144	-9,574	783,968	876,632	870,746	564,011	882,540	856,635	883,703	9,037,123
2009	882,541	797,002	877,283	848,768	869,165	845,074	869,340	868,947	843,897	511,632	-7,361	742,419	8,948,707
2010	878,733	792,936	876,479	848,034	868,299	840,154	866,024	861,372	839,622	876,528	851,894	876,109	10,276,184
2011	876,965	748,164	719,301	109,199	467,479	833,427	866,744	859,437	839,953	877,483	852,153	878,225	8,928,530
2012	838,884	820,221	877,011	828,194	871,386	837,538	862,840	753,773	739,607	440,952	-6,778	-9,670	7,853,958
2013	234,756	786,215	872,247	725,726	792,859	839,435	861,067	855,027	819,910	863,878	845,076	871,555	9,367,751
2014	874,106	787,825	874,522	332,420	296,307	840,791	864,611	862,315	831,458	867,918	847,487	876,576	9,156,336
2015	875,927	786,130	876,019	821,574	862,583	654,977	865,676	861,038	830,419	588,793	-7,857	369,462	8,384,741
2016	878,873	824,731	879,543	851,889	878,962	845,014	856,982	867,242	838,897	664,881	832,346	877,397	10,096,757
2017	879,734	782,888	877,984	392,191	-11,012	695,290	458,451	850,613	846,402	871,269	852,299	881,354	8,377,463
2018	879,165	795,662	880,814	849,658	875,517	842,290	719,900	865,223	840,178	875,033	851,115	878,031	10,152,586
2019	88,257	-2,627	309,583	853,069	468,622	843,033	865,372	670,715	846,007	880,766	854,113	883,492	7,560,402
2020	880,614	823,347	881,611	850,983	877,841	849,663	876,175	874,042	619,652	0	661,862	765,427	8,961,217
2021	880,837	794,556	870,711	733,882	871,277	848,641	873,756	797,085	529,867	876,010	851,332	878,845	9,806,799
2022	878,556	794,426	873,754	26,331	0	134,730	856,601	866,798	837,493	871,252	844,470	874,592	7,859,003
2023	848,502	790,524	719,577	844,051	868,156	838,230	859,096	858,586	832,047	361,630	0	0	7,820,399
2024	0	631,437	482,116	0	185,565	429,216	803,948	698,916	778,772	807,057	784,555	595,191	6,196,773
2025	811,789	732,988	812,183	654,097	0	537,292	805,090	804,894	807,043	840,982	819,572	835,862	8,461,792
2026	843,718	749,238	840,825	819,741	839,180	811,885	860,423	859,060					--

== Surrounding population ==
The Nuclear Regulatory Commission defines two emergency planning zones around nuclear power plants: a plume exposure pathway zone with a radius of 10 miles (16 km), concerned primarily with exposure to, and inhalation of, airborne radioactive contamination, and an ingestion pathway zone of about 50 miles (80 km), concerned primarily with ingestion of food and liquid contaminated by radioactivity.

The 2010 U.S. population within 10 miles (16 km) of Waterford was 75,538, an increase of 7.4 percent in a decade, according to an analysis of U.S. Census data for msnbc.com. The 2010 U.S. population within 50 miles (80 km) was 1,969,431, a decrease of 0.8 percent since 2000. Cities within 50 miles include New Orleans (33 miles to city center).

== Seismic risk ==
The Nuclear Regulatory Commission's estimate of the risk each year of an earthquake intense enough to cause core damage to the reactor at Waterford was 1 in 50,000, according to an NRC study published in August 2010.

== See also ==
- River Bend Nuclear Generating Station, in West Feliciana Parish, Louisiana
