= Lake Salvador =

- Location within Louisiana
- Location: Jefferson / Lafourche / St. Charles parishes, Louisiana, US
- Coordinates: 29.7238°N 90.2462°W
- Type: Estuary
- Basin countries: United States
- Max. length: 26 km (16 mi)
- Max. width: 19 km (12 mi)
- Surface area: 18,100 ha (44,800 acres)
- Average depth: 1.8 m (6 ft)

Lake Salvador (French: Lac Salvador) is a 44,800-acre (18,100 ha) lake about 12 miles (19 km) southwest of New Orleans, Louisiana, in Jefferson, Lafourche, and St. Charles parishes. The lake has had multiple names. On the d'Anville map of 1732, the lake was Lac des Ounchas. The Darby map of 1816 lists the lake as Ouacha Lake and at other times it was spelled Ouachas Lake. Finally, on the Cram map of 1916, the lake was both Lake Ouache and Salvador.

Lake Salvador is a shallow lake, with an average depth of about six feet (1.8 m). It is mostly at sea level and measures about 16 miles (26 km) long and 12 miles (19 km) wide. Bayou Des Allemands feeds the lake then flows into the Gulf of Mexico. Lake Salvador is surrounded by swamp and offers a habitat for catfish, bass, and red drum.

Young bull sharks have been known to prefer low-salinity or brackish water, and in 2015 one was found in the lake. A Louisiana Department of Wildlife and Fisheries Marine Fisheries Biologist stated that bull sharks are one of the more aggressive shark species worldwide. Biologist manager Shane Granier stated, "It’s not necessarily a common occurrence, but it’s not unheard of [to find sharks in the lake]."

== See also ==
- List of lakes of the United States
