= Fighting Wildcats Stadium =

Multi-purpose stadium in Destrehan

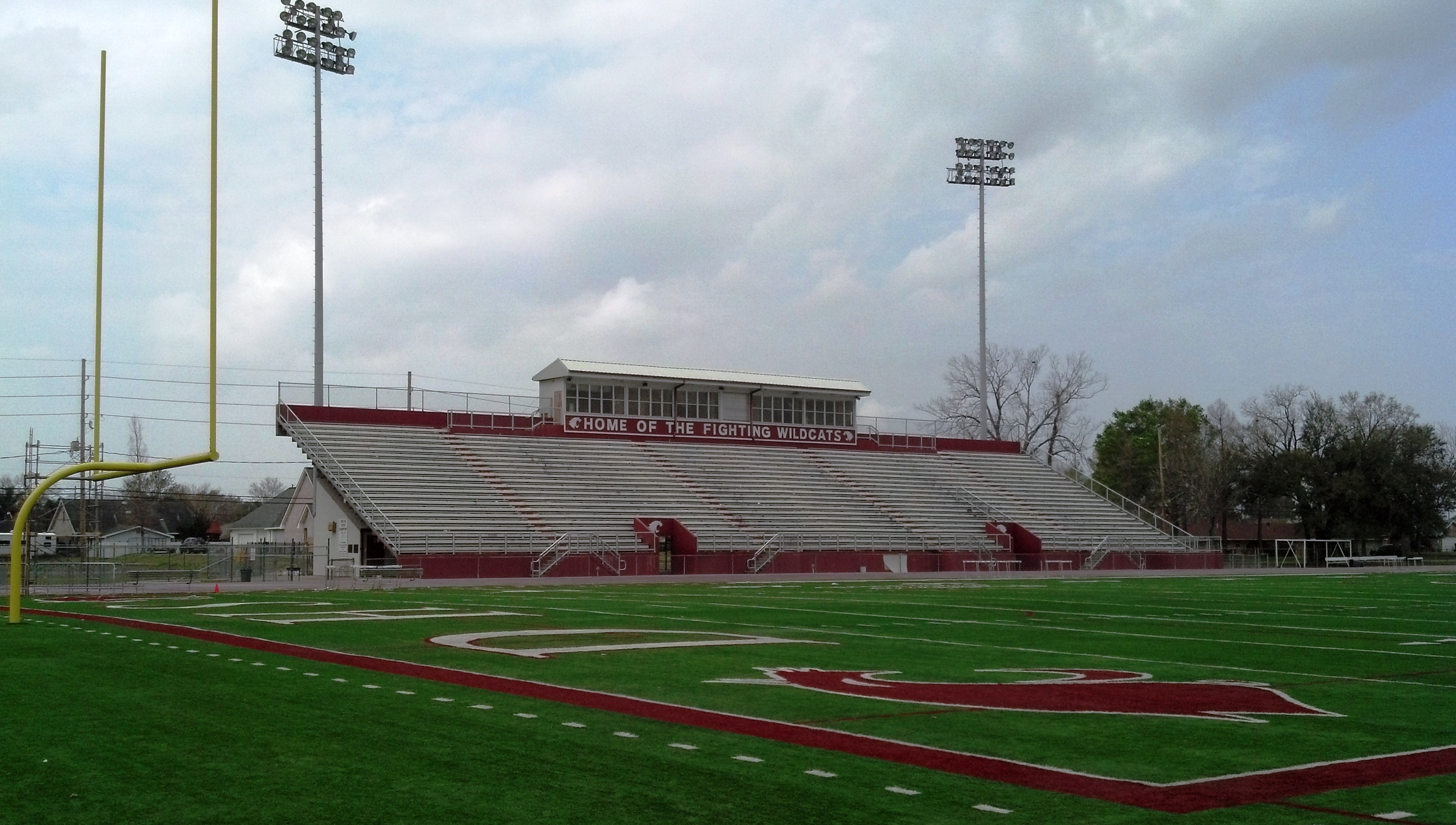
- Interactive map of Fighting Wildcats Stadium
- Location: Destrehan, Louisiana
- Coordinates: 29.964805°N 90.382693°W
- Owner: St. Charles Parish Public School System
- Operator: Destrehan High School Athletics Department
- Capacity: 5,000
- Surface: FieldTurf

Construction
- Opened: 1981
- Renovated: 2008
- Architects: Picou & Weimer, A.I.A

Tenant
- Destrehan High School (LHSAA)

Fighting Wildcats Stadium is a 5,000-seat multi-purpose stadium opened in 1981 in Destrehan, Louisiana. It is home to the Destrehan High School Fighting Wildcats football, soccer and track and field teams in the LHSAA. The stadium playing surface is FieldTurf with an all-weather running track surrounding the field.

In addition to the Destrehan High School athletic teams, the stadium hosts the annual Ed Reed River Parishes football jamboree games and the annual Ed Reed football camp. The St. Charles Parish School Board and Recreation Department also utilizes the facility for multiple athletic events.

== Gallery ==
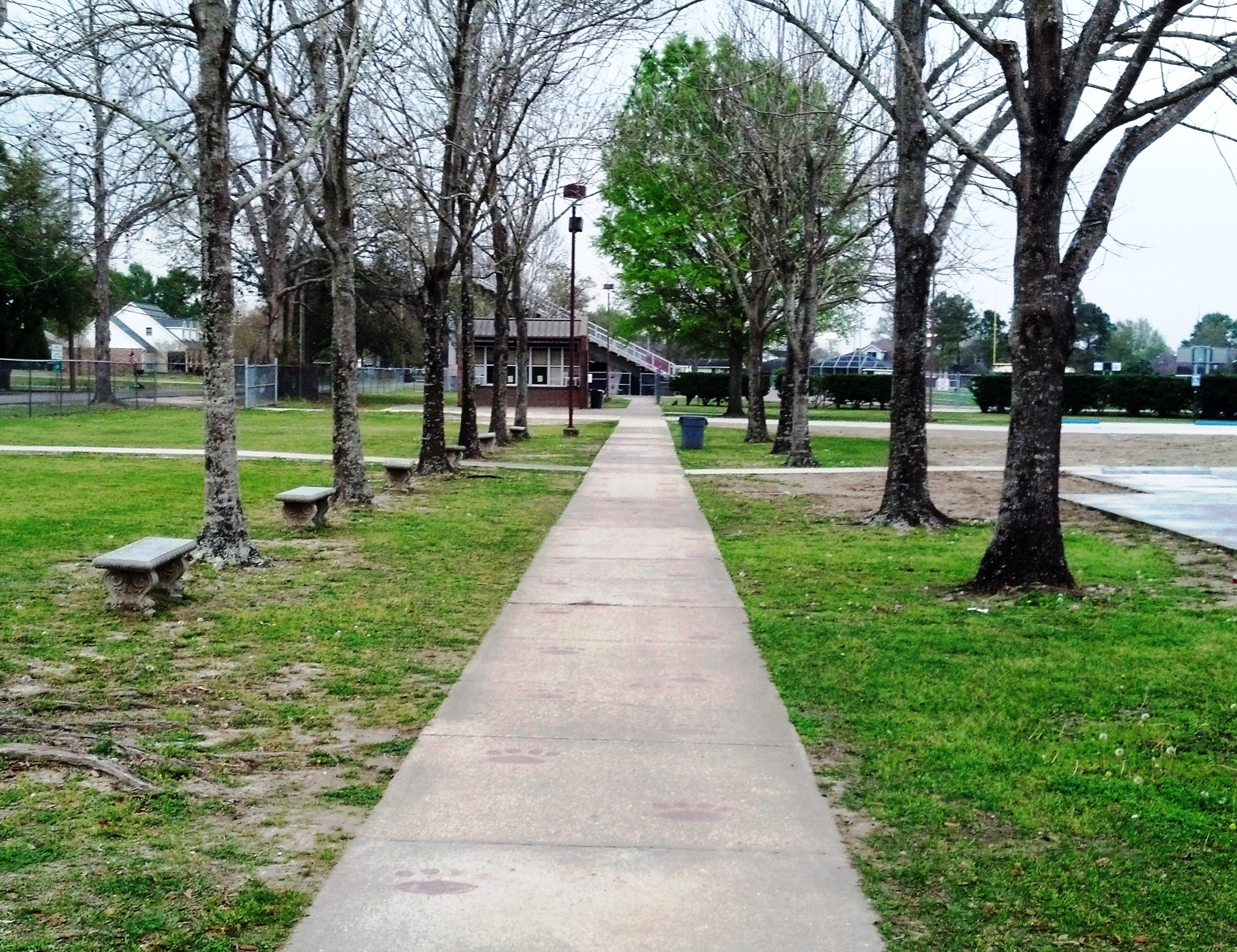
Fighting Wildcats Walk at Fighting Wildcats Stadium

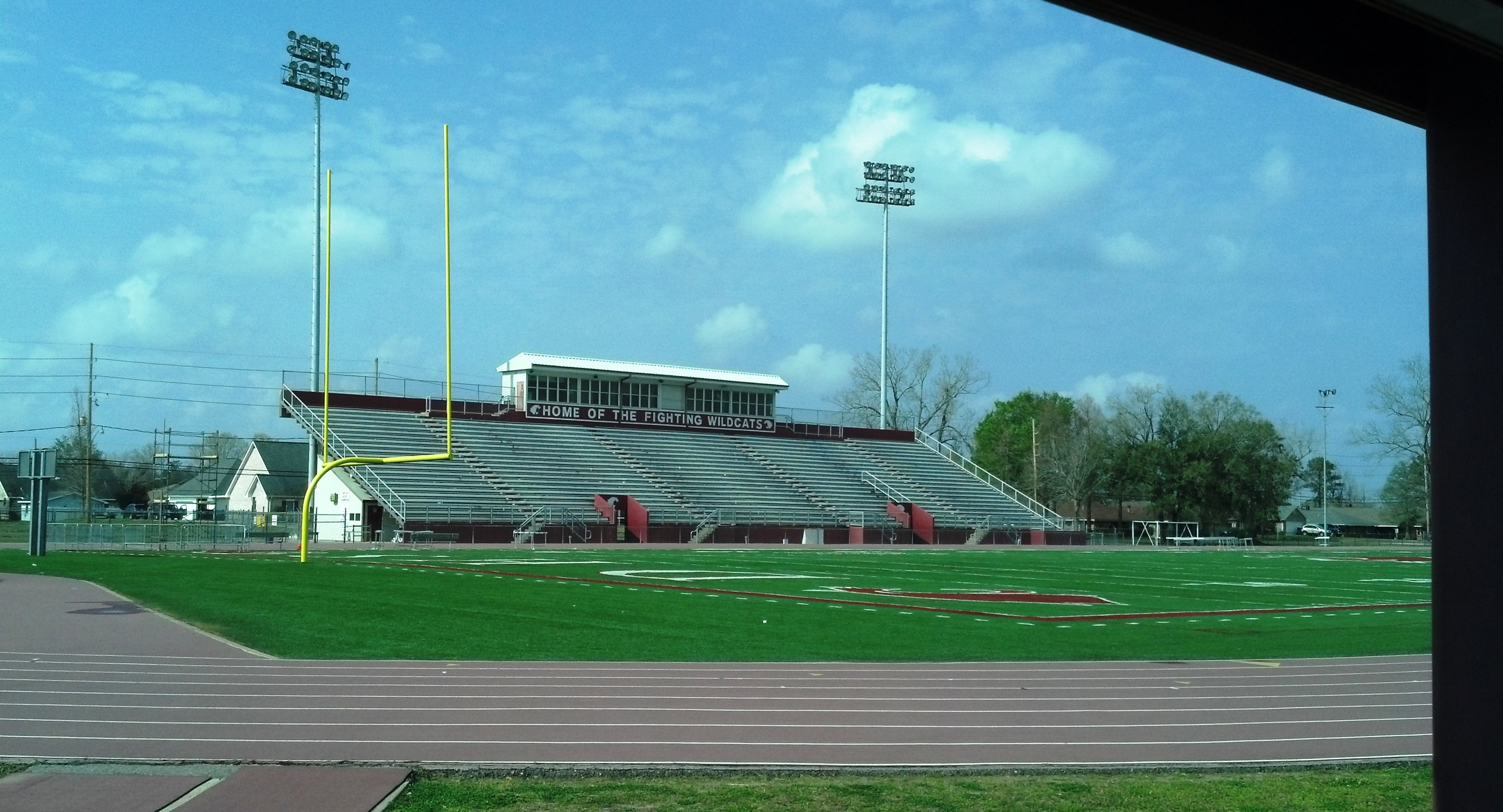
Fighting Wildcats Stadium - home stands, tunnel view

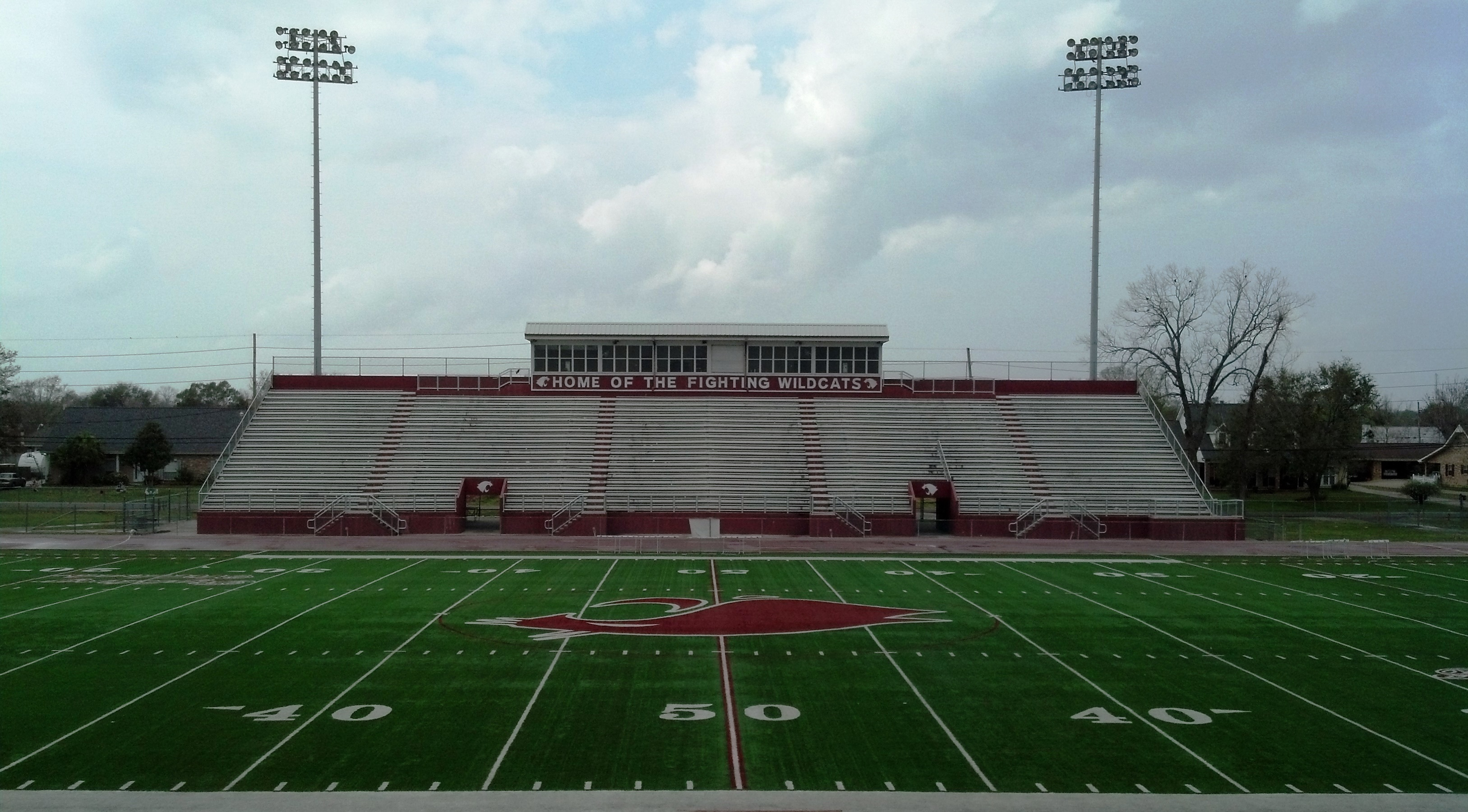
Fighting Wildcats Stadium - home stands, 50 yard line

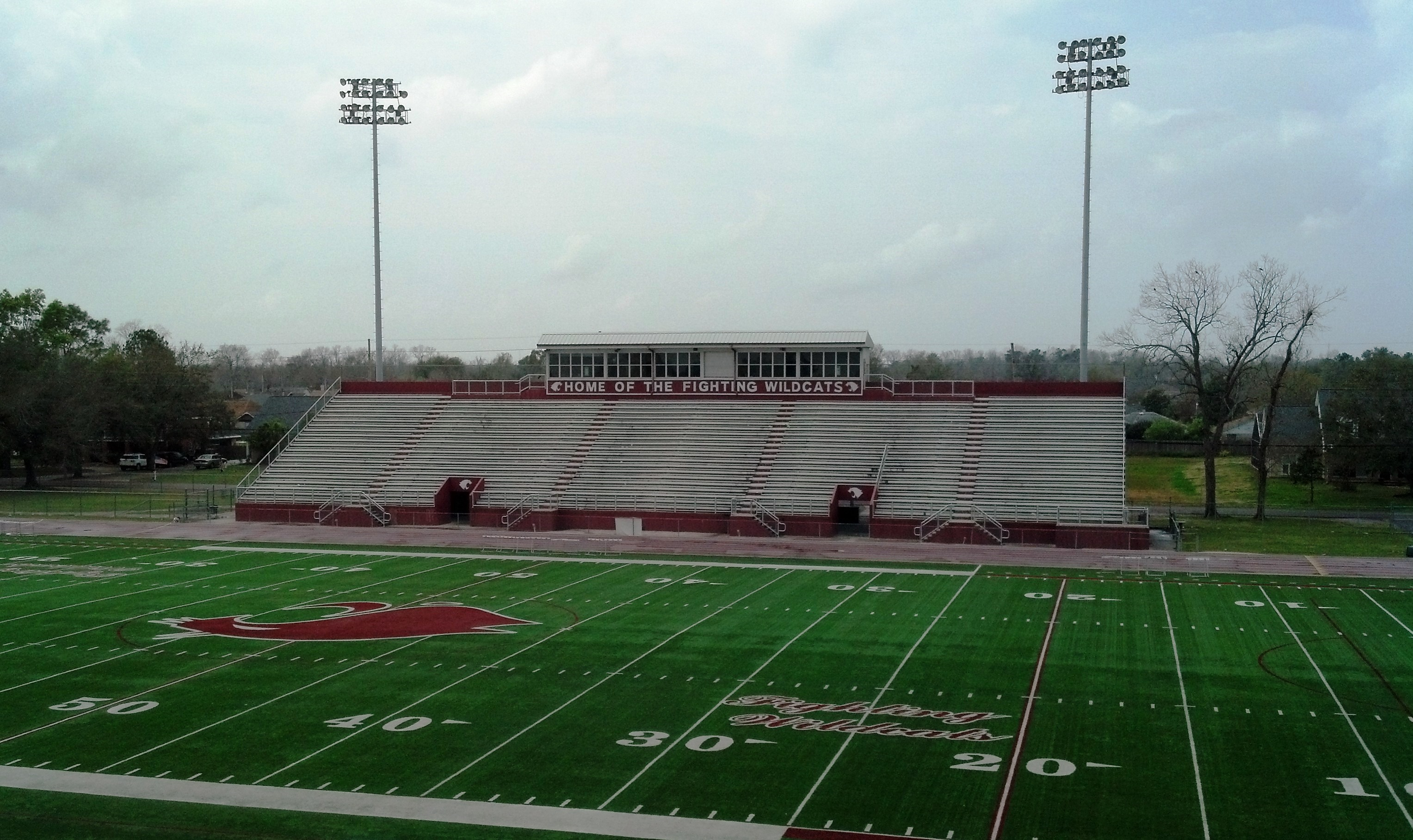
Fighting Wildcats Stadium - home stands, 20 yard line

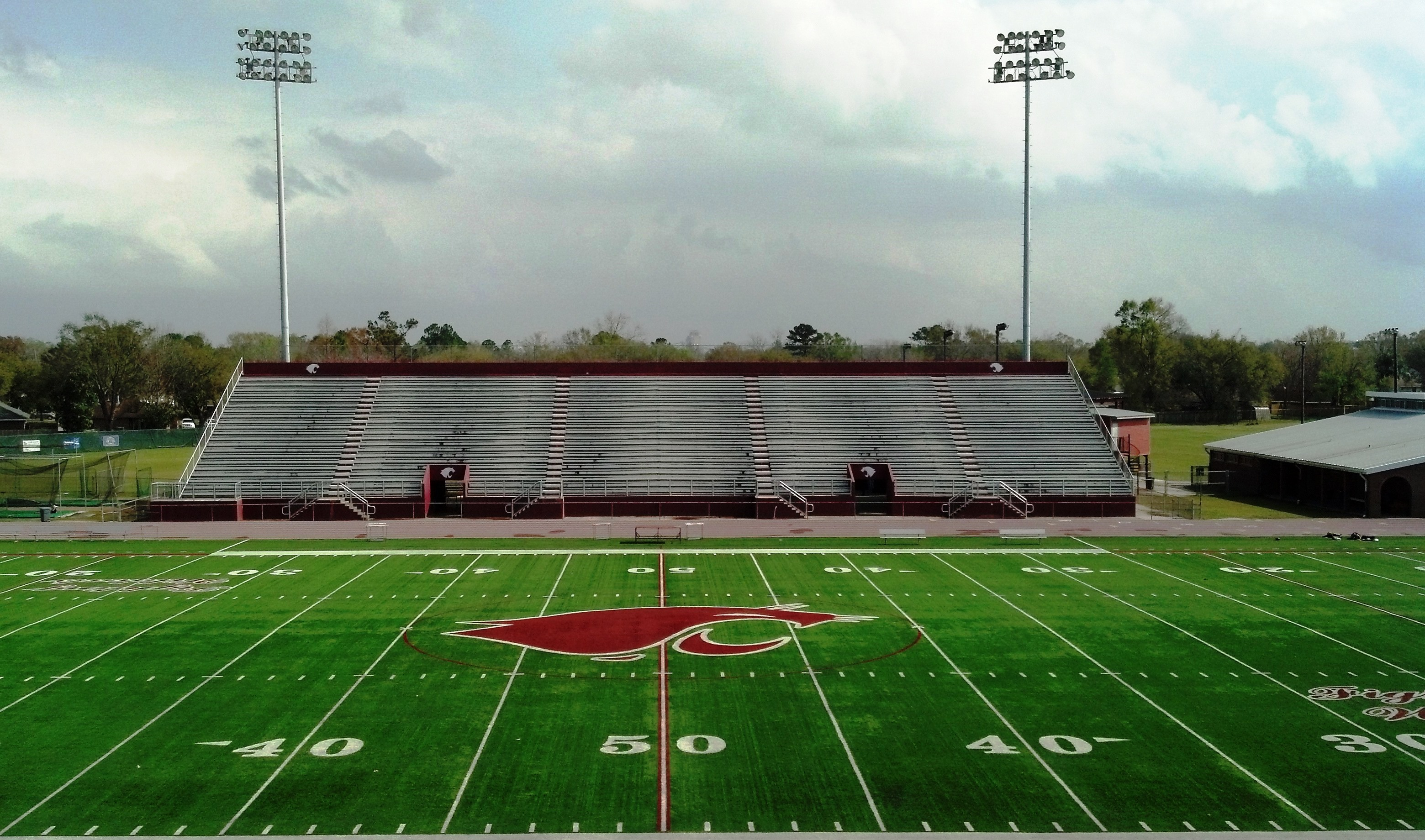
Fighting Wildcats Stadium - away stands, 50 yard line

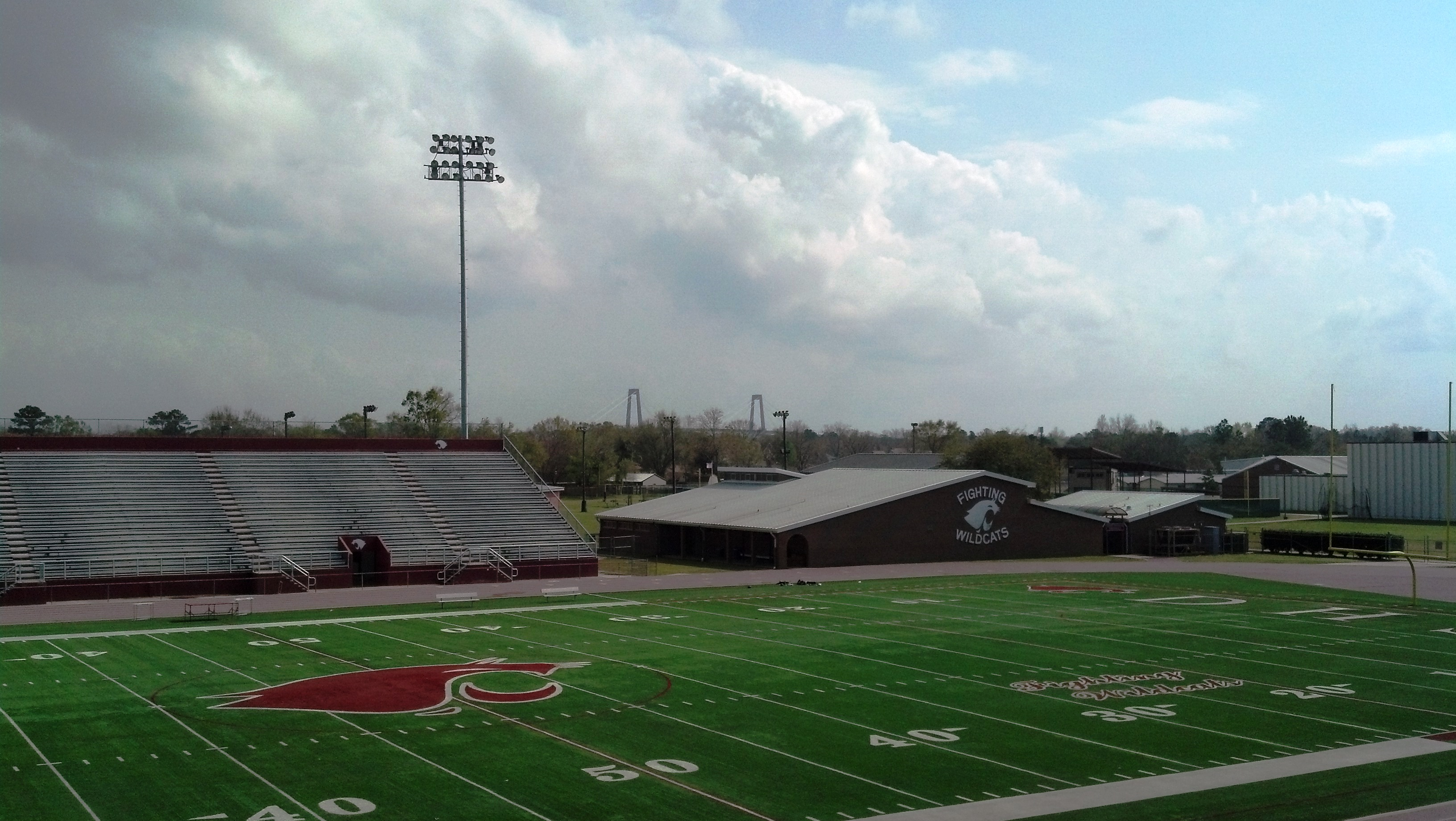
Fighting Wildcats Stadium - away stands and Field House

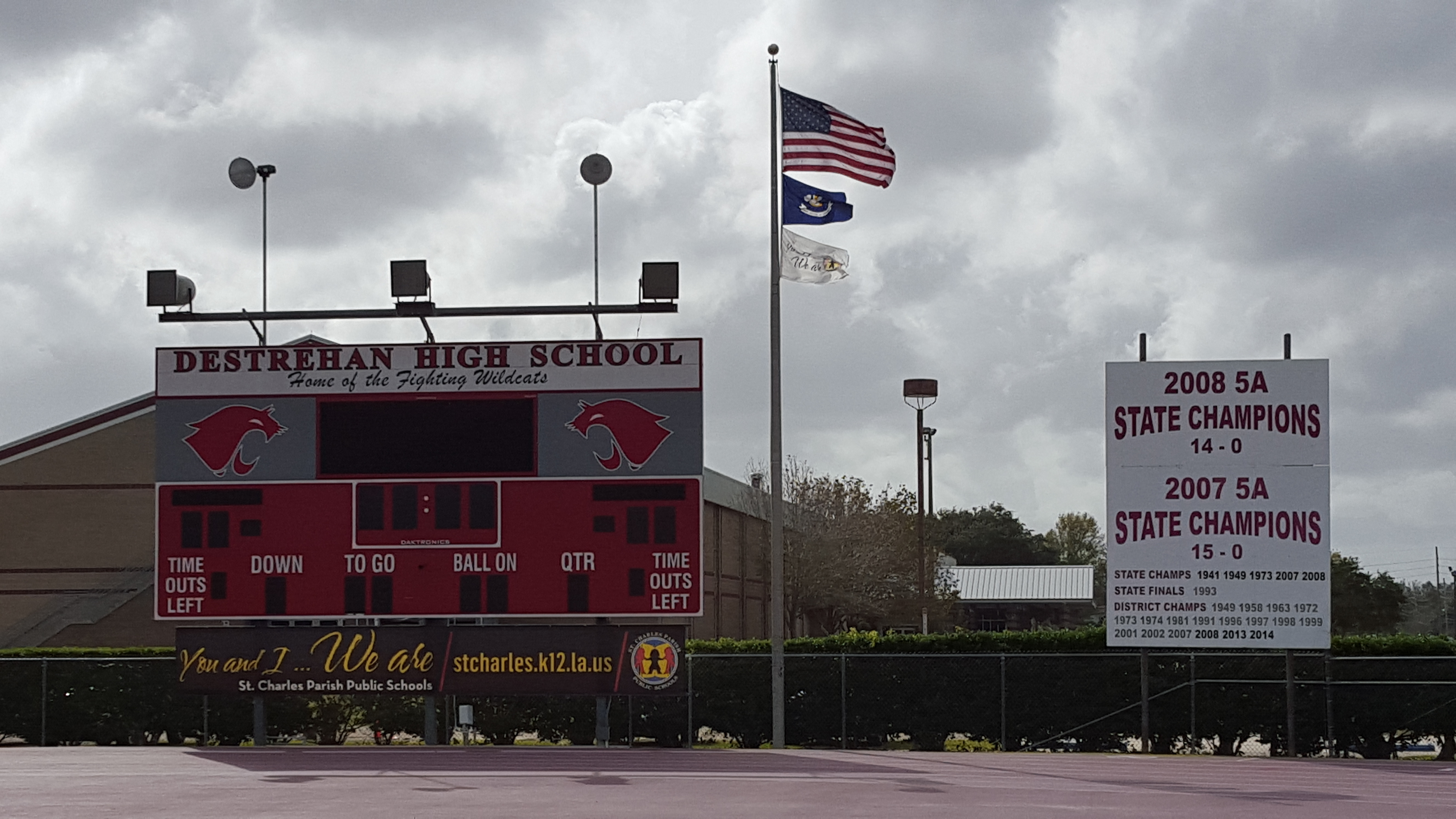
Fighting Wildcats Stadium scoreboard and championship billboard

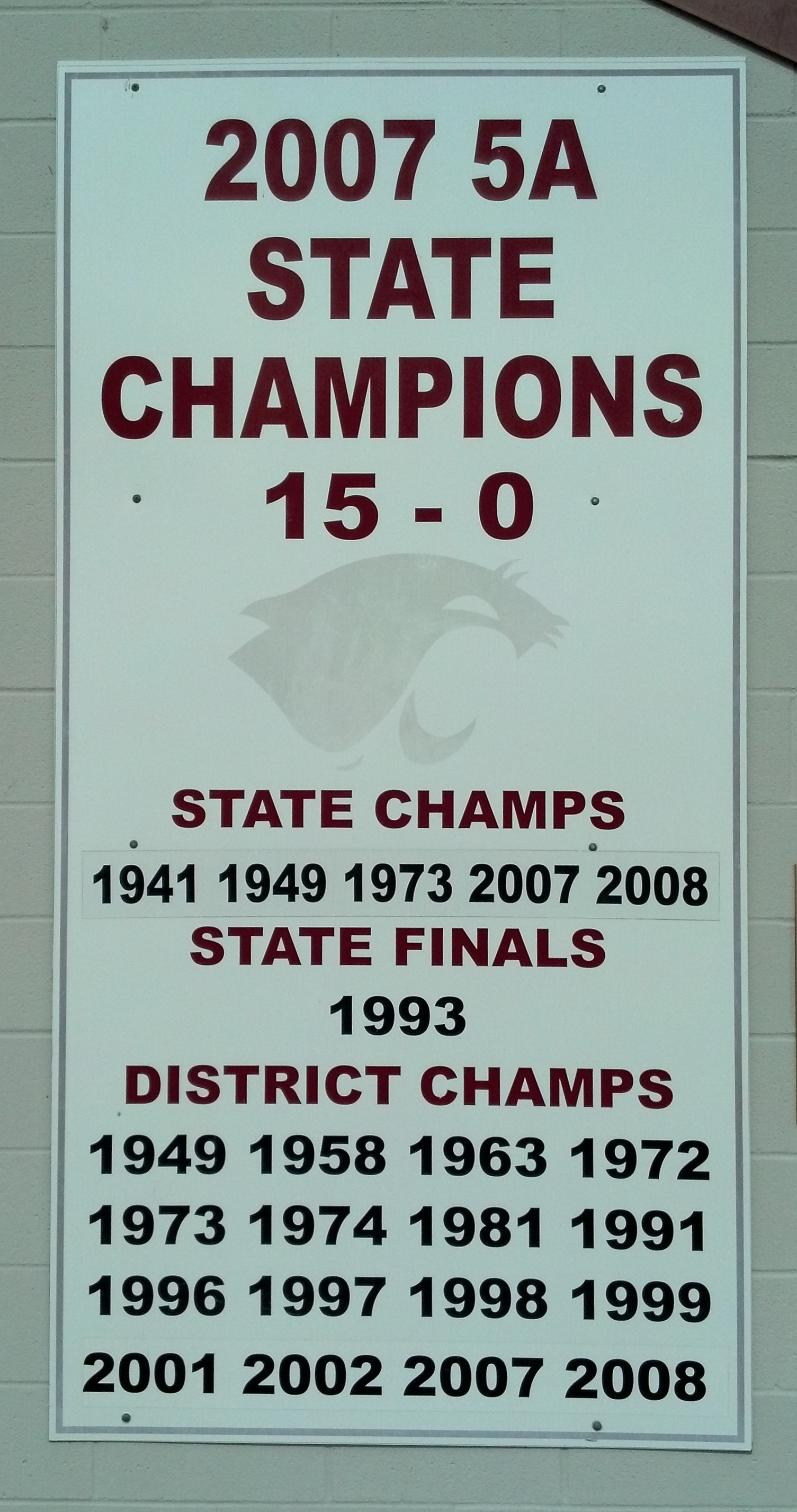
Fighting Wildcats Stadium - championship plaque

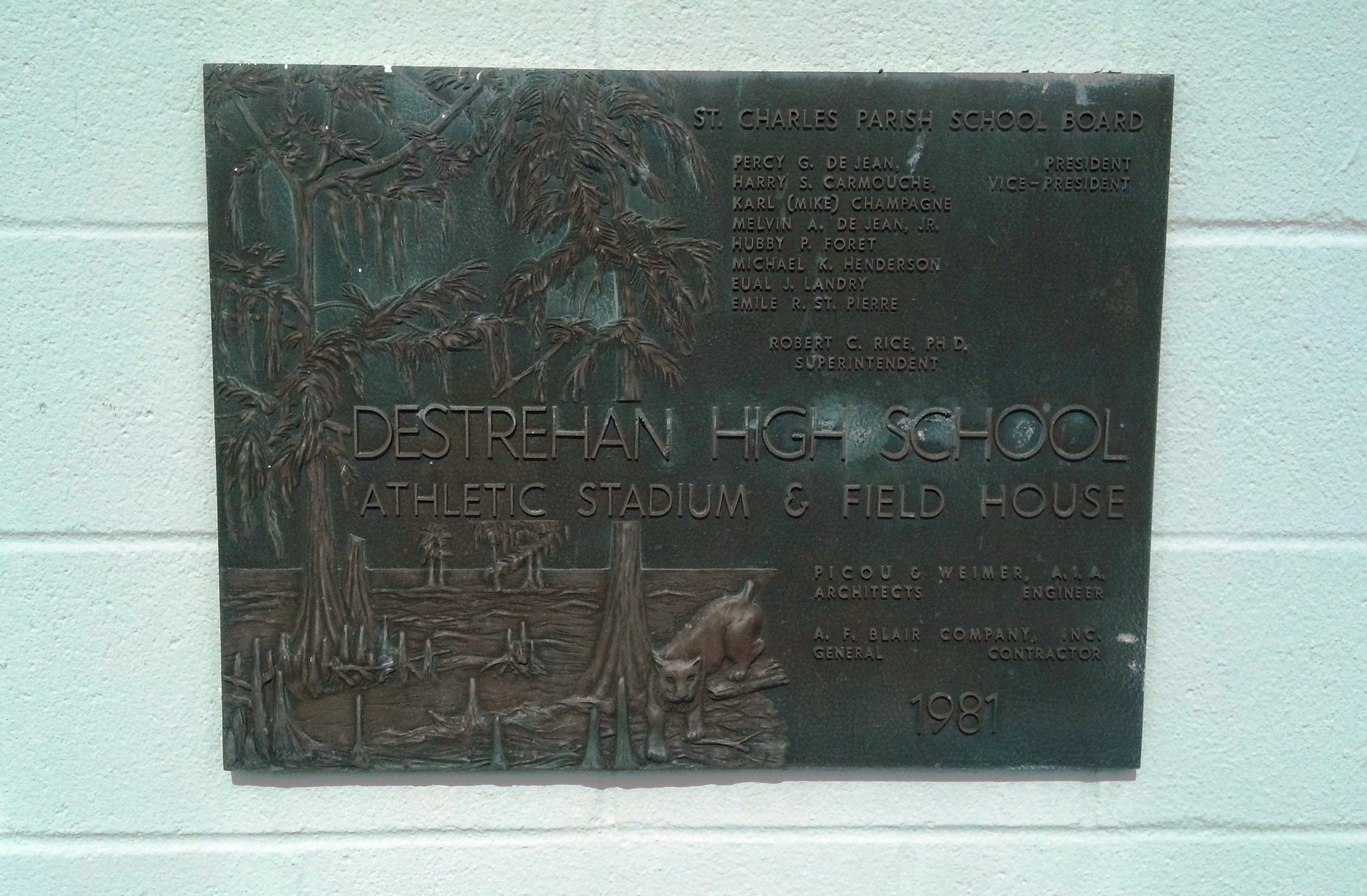
Fighting Wildcats Stadium - dedication plaque

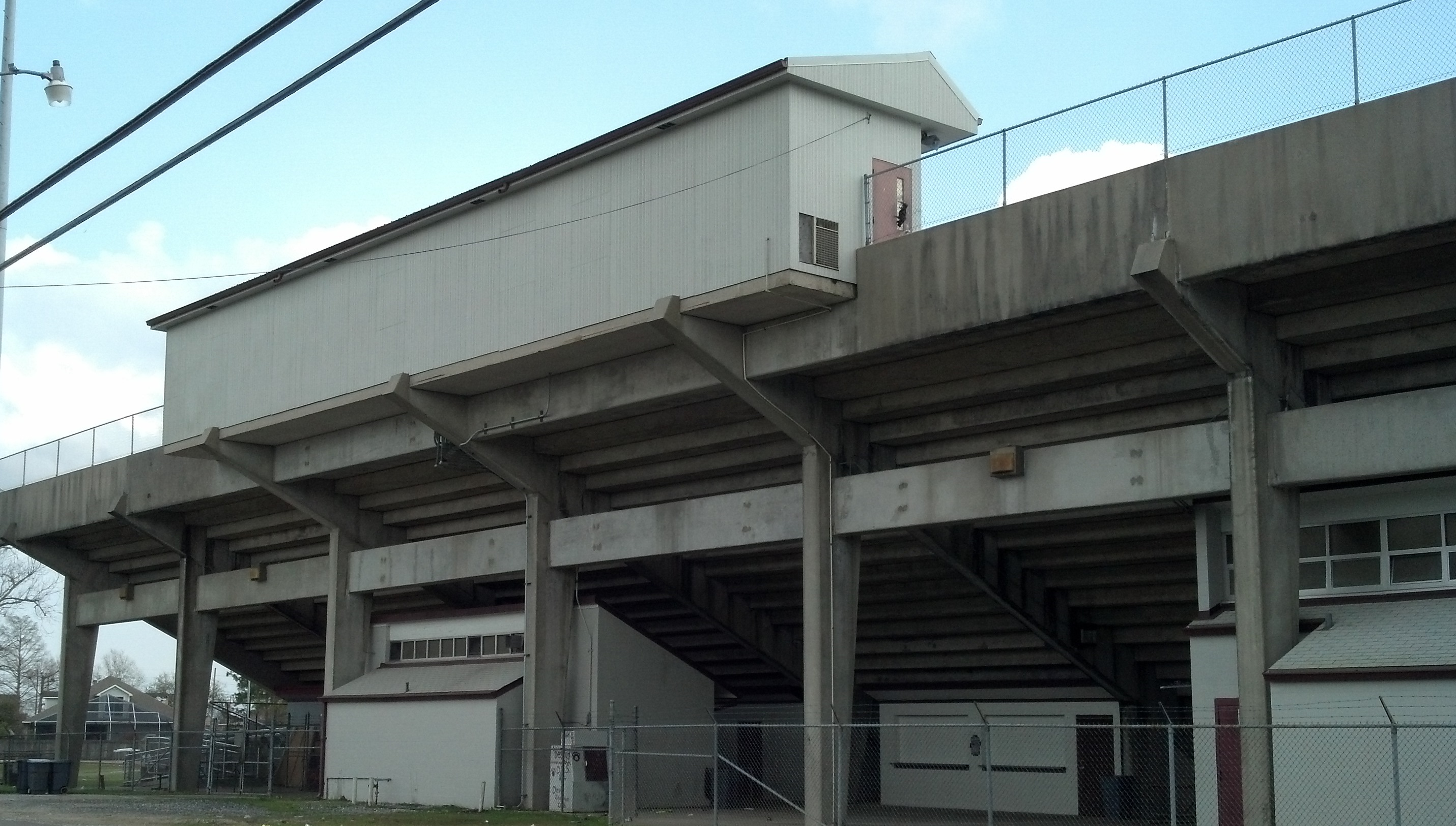
DHS Fighting Wildcats Stadium

== Fighting Wildcats Field House ==
The Fighting Wildcats Field House opened in 1981 is adjacent to the football stadium. It houses the coaches’ offices, locker rooms, meeting room, weight room, equipment room and athletic training facilities. The training room features hydrotherapy which includes hot/cold jacuzzis and multiple stations to treat players. The athletic training staff is also housed in the building.

=== Fighting Wildcats Field House gallery ===
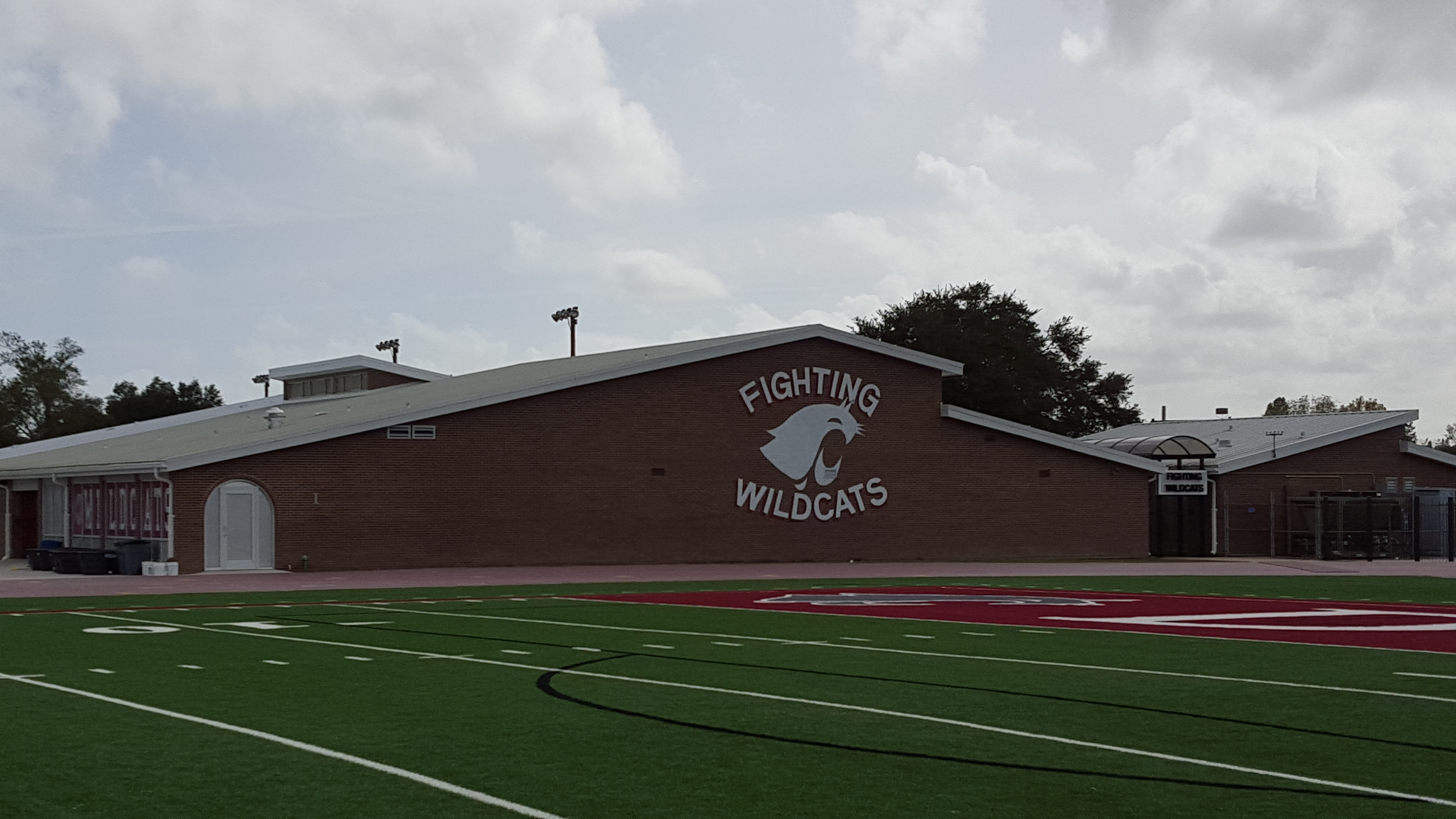
Fighting Wildcats Field House - game field

Fighting Wildcats Field House and Strength and Conditioning Facility

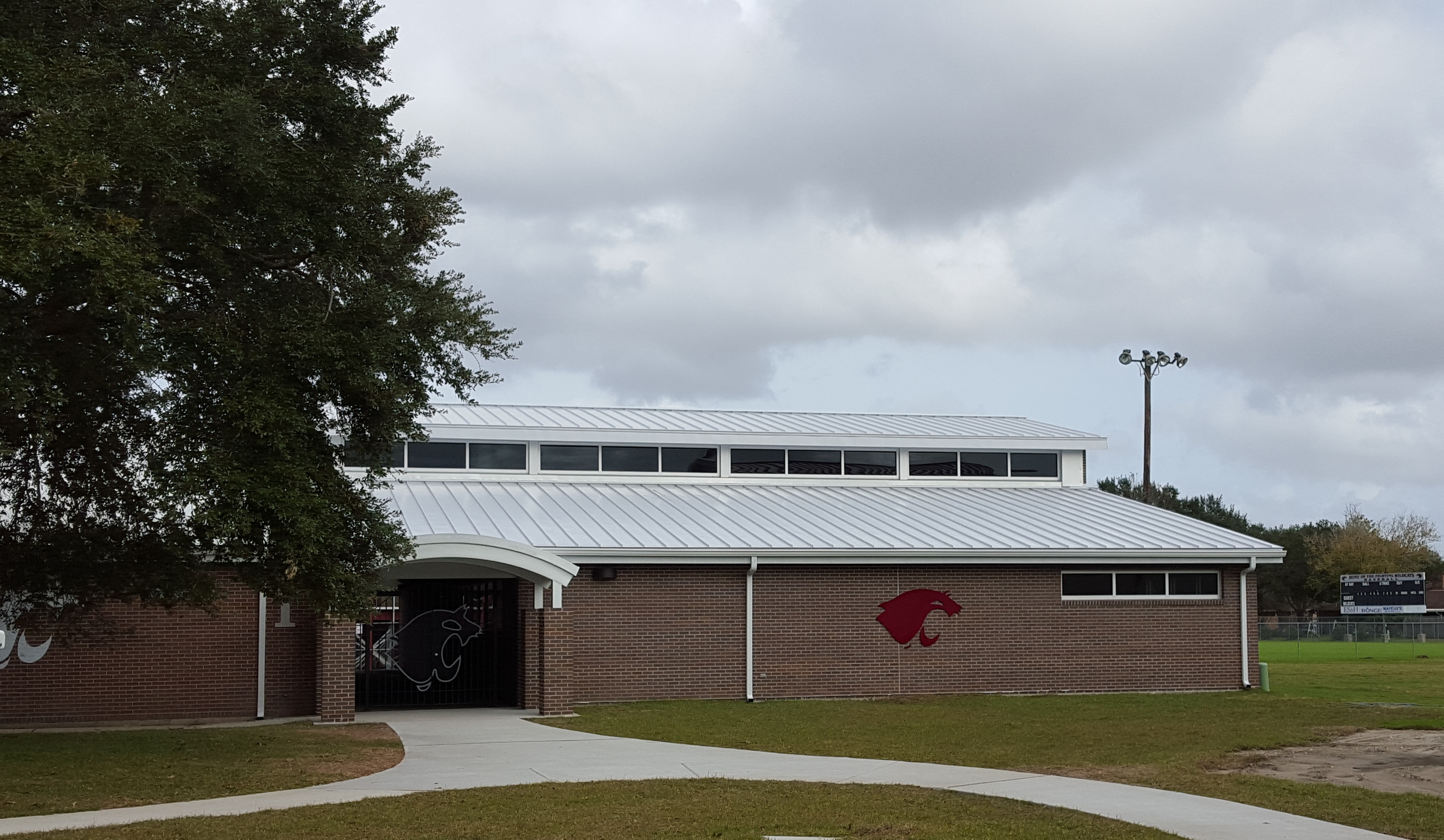
Fighting Wildcats Fieldhouse - Strength and Conditioning Facility

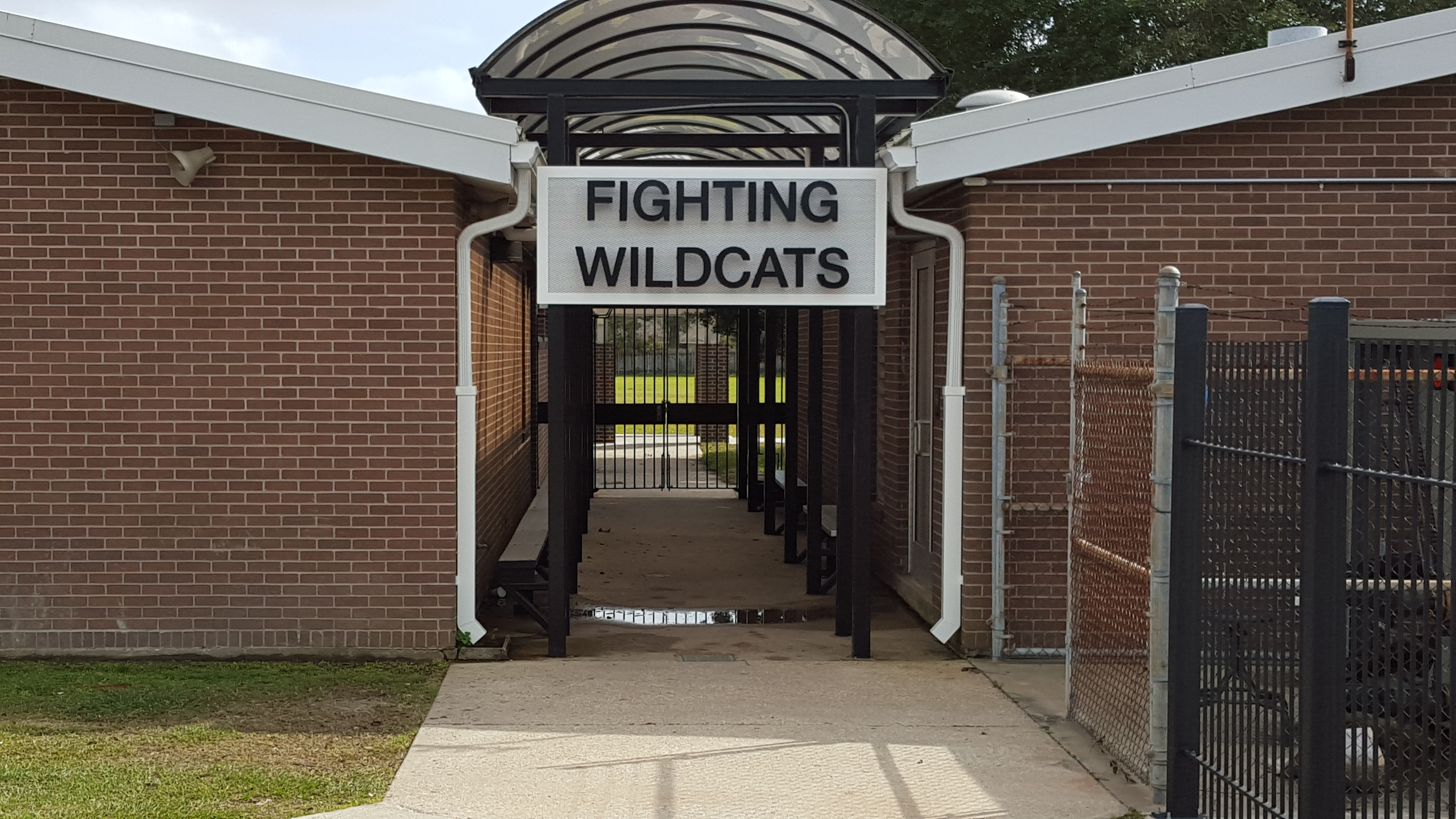
Fighting Wildcats Field House - Fighting Wildcats Stadium tunnel

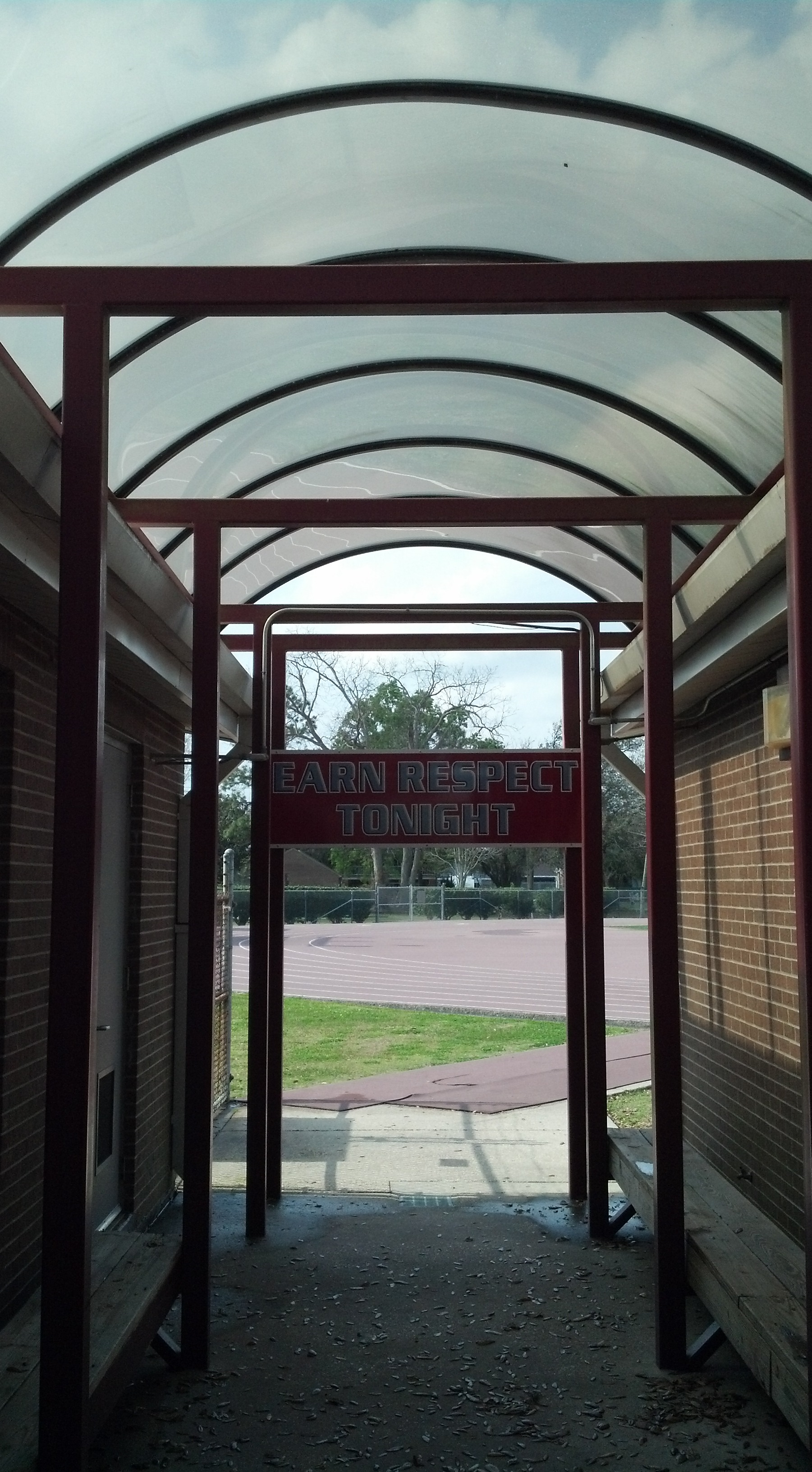
Fighting Wildcats Stadium tunnel

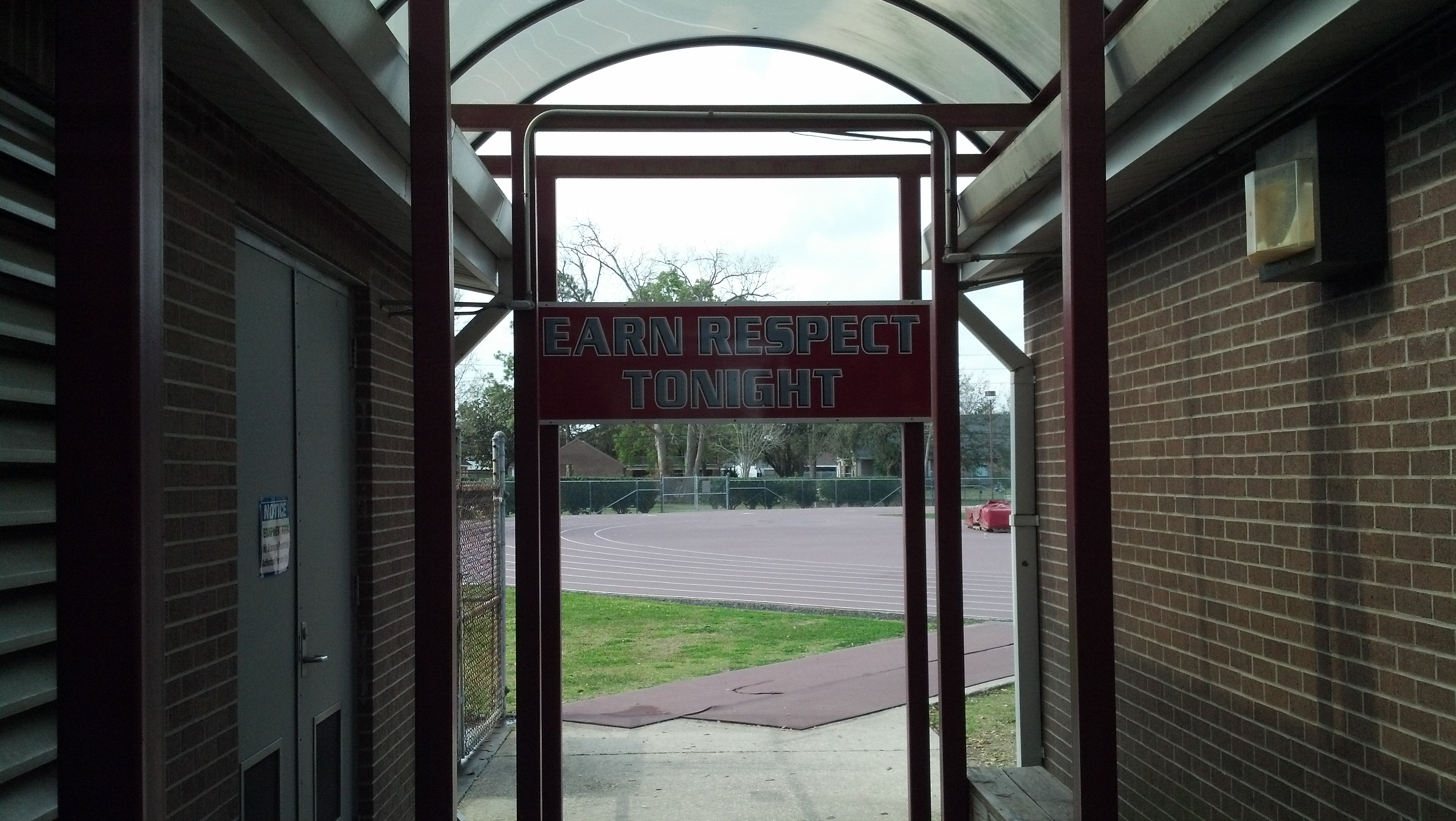
Fighting Wildcats Stadium tunnel signage

Fighting Wildcats Field House - Strength and Conditioning Facility

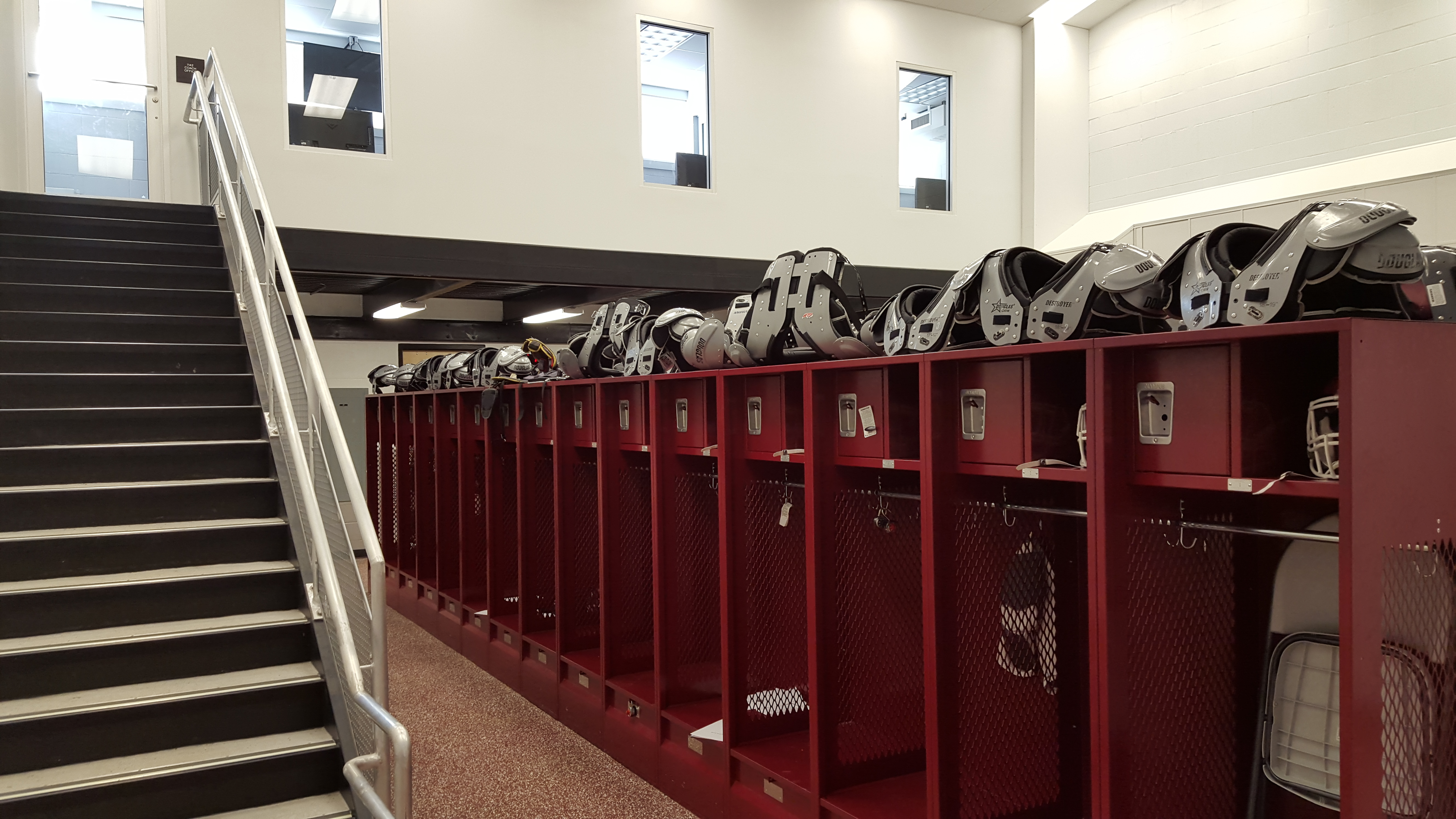
Fighting Wildcats Field House - Locker Room

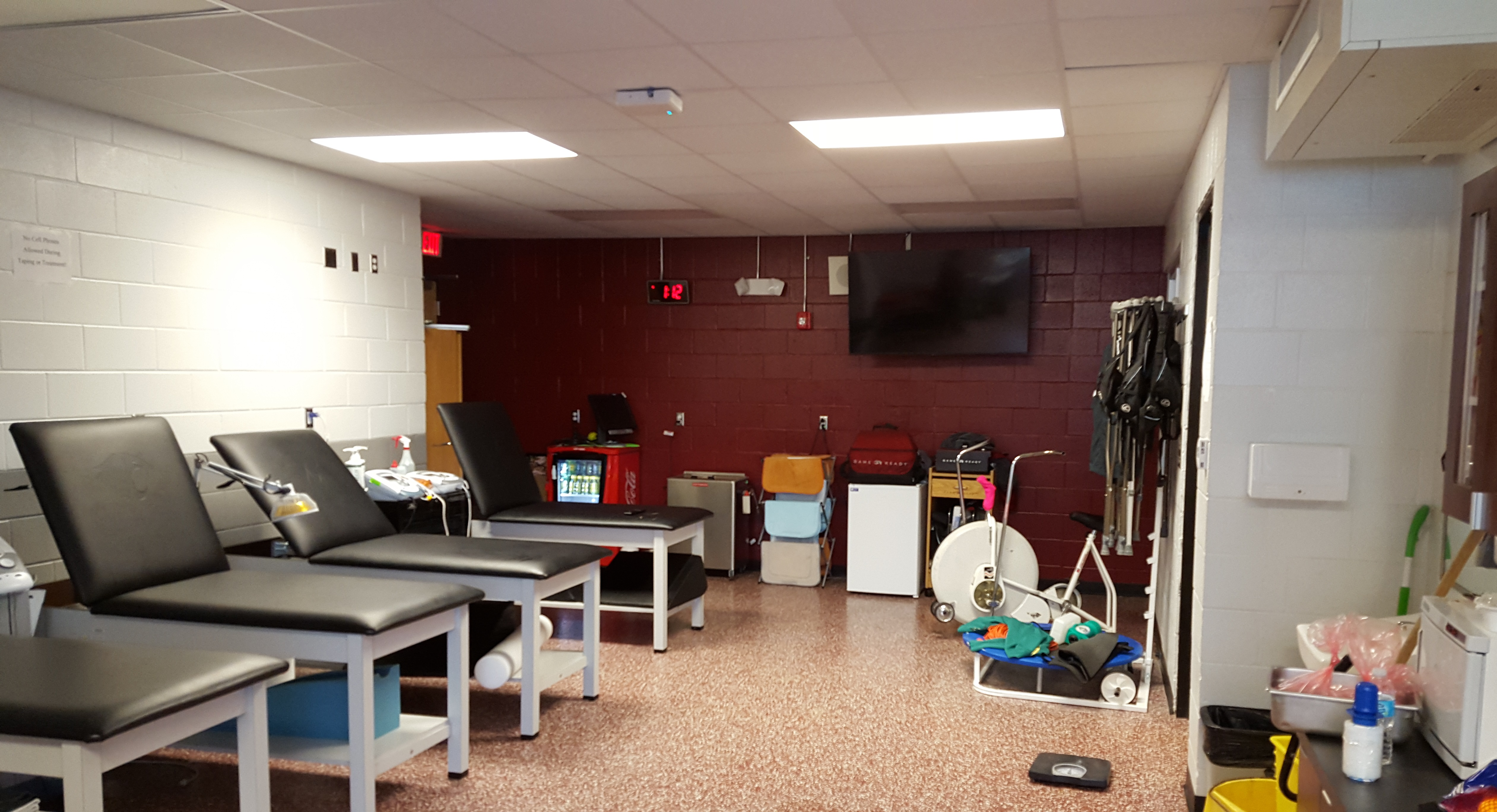
Fighting Wildcats Field House - Training Room

== Fighting Wildcats Football Practice Complex ==
The Fighting Wildcats Football Practice Complex is adjacent to the Field House and consists of two practice fields. A lighted practice field and a special teams practice field located next to the main practice field. The practice field is also used for javelin events during LHSAA track and field meets and by the Fighting Wildcats track and field team.

=== Fighting Wildcats Football Practice Complex gallery ===
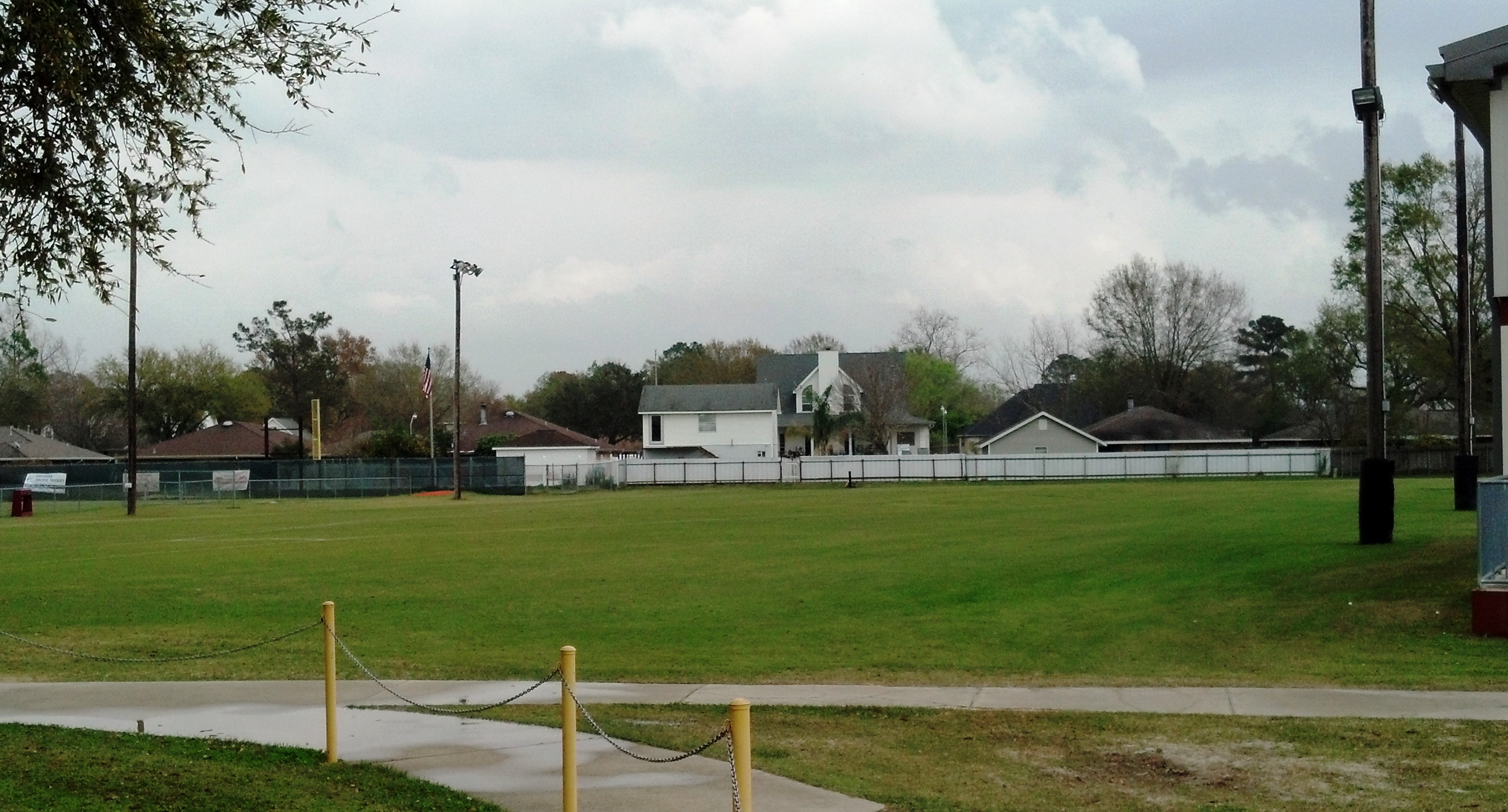
Fighting Wildcats Lighted Main Practice Field

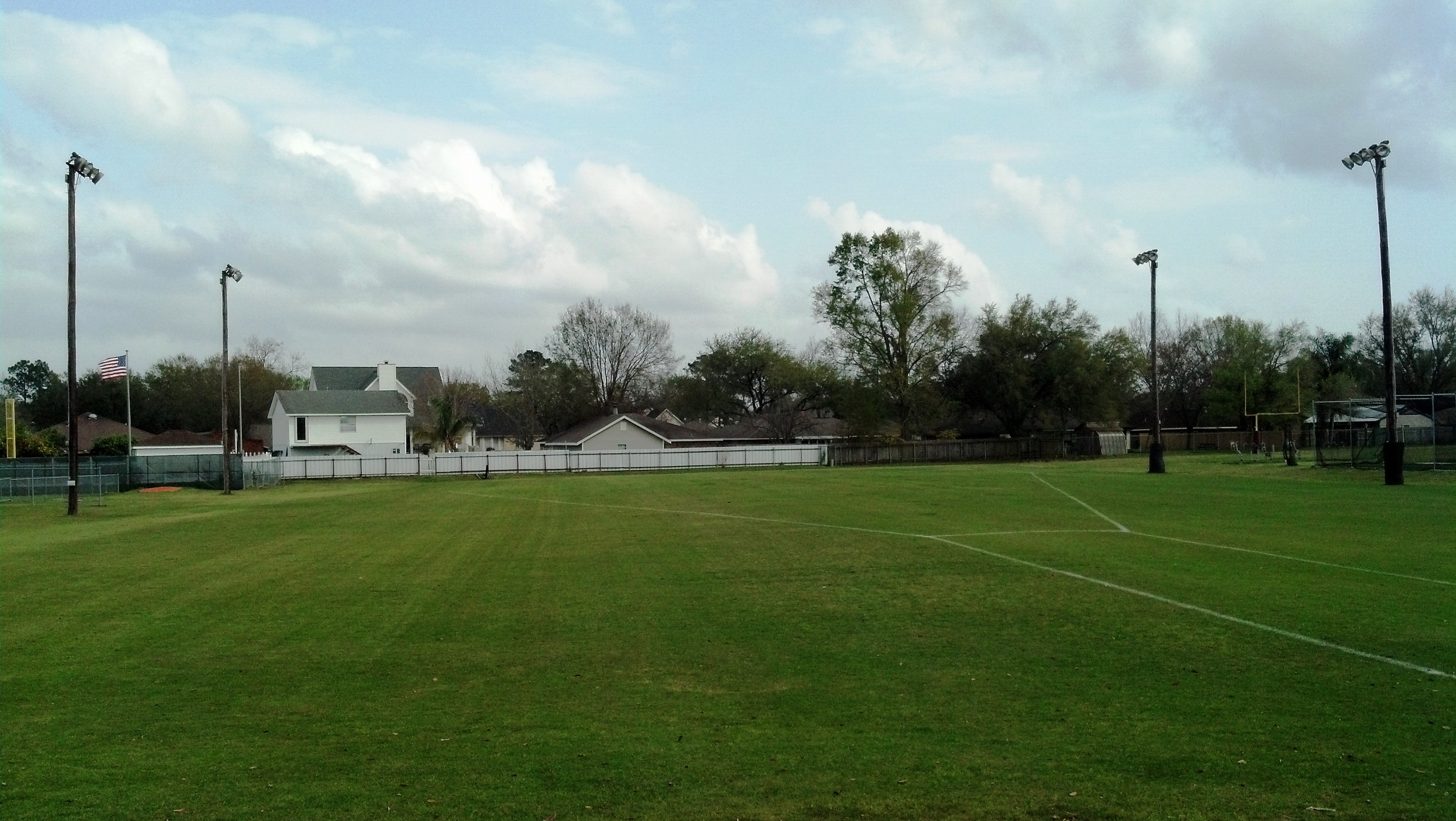
Fighting Wildcats Lighted Main Practice Field - Field House view

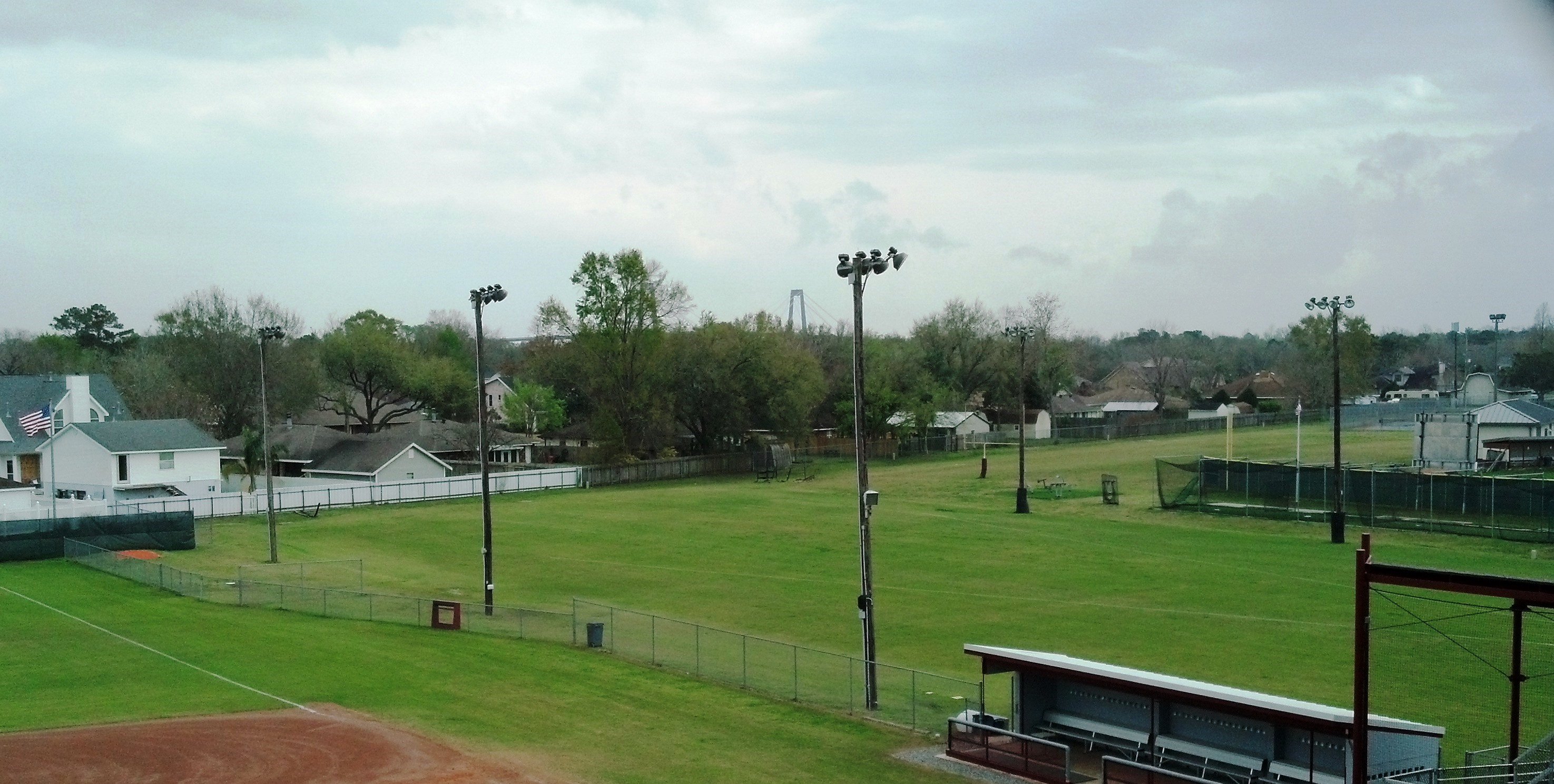
Fighting Wildcats Lighted Football Practice Complex

== See also ==
- Destrehan High School
