= Devon Walker (American football) =

American football player (born 1990)

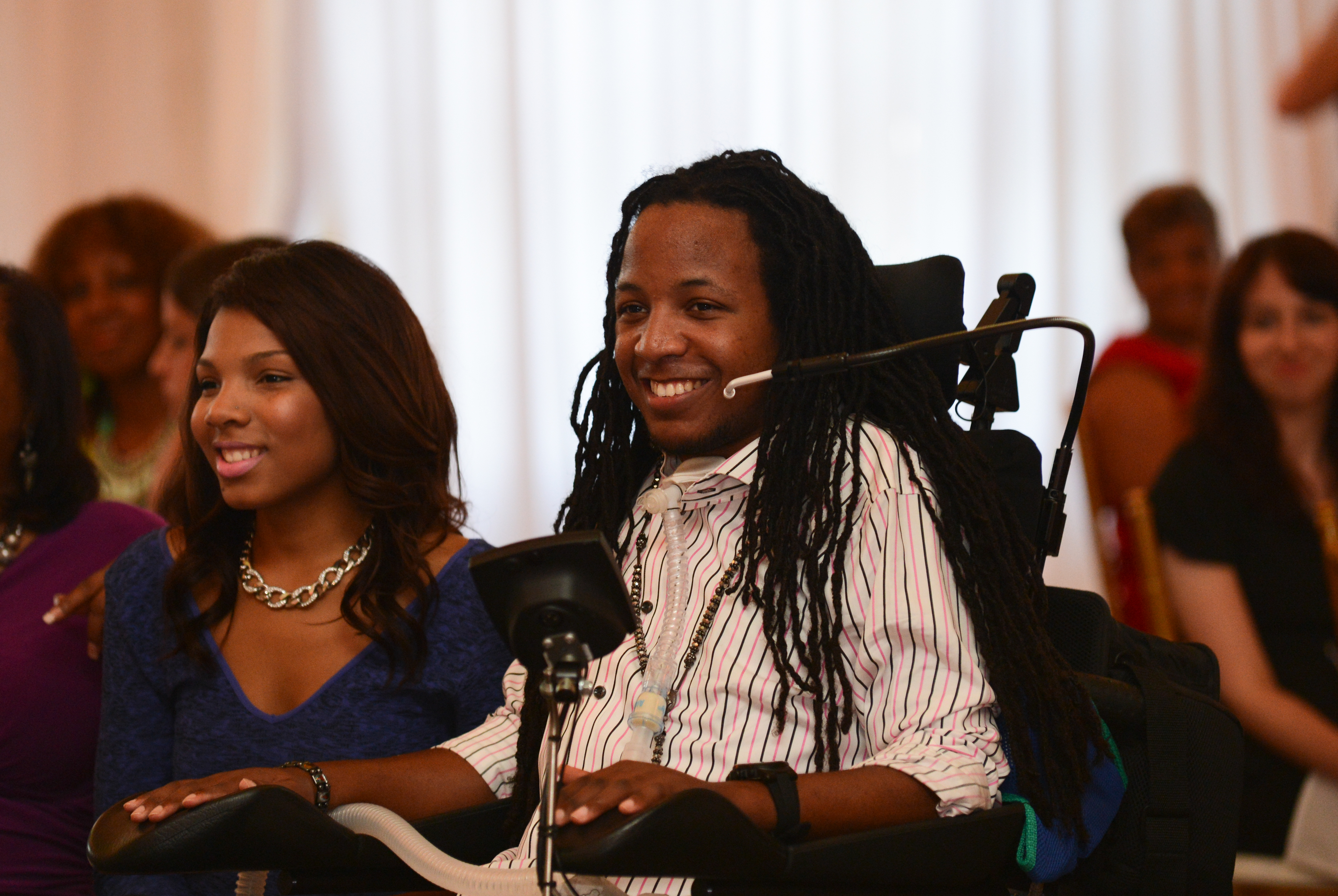

Profile
- Position: Safety

Personal information
- Born: November 29, 1990 (age 35); New Orleans, Louisiana, U.S.
- Listed height: 6 ft 1 in (1.85 m)
- Listed weight: 173 lb (78 kg)

Career information
- High school: Destrehan (LA) Destrehan High School
- College: Tulane
- NFL draft: 2013: undrafted

Career history
- New Orleans Saints (2014)*
- * Offseason or practice squad member only

Devon Walker (born November 29, 1990) is an American former college football player. He was playing at Tulane University when he was paralyzed from the neck down during a college game following a collision with a teammate. He signed a one-day contract with the New Orleans Saints in May 2014.

== Background ==
Walker grew up in the New Orleans suburb of Destrehan and graduated from Destrehan High School. He attended Tulane University in New Orleans, where he graduated in May 2014 with a degree in cell and molecular biology.

== Injury ==
Walker was injured on September 8, 2012 during a game against Tulsa when he collided with a Tulane teammate and injured his C4 vertebrae. He was paralyzed from the neck down. He was a senior at Tulane at the time.

== Signing ==
In May 2014, the New Orleans Saints signed Walker and invited him to their rookie minicamp. Walker was signed to a one-day NFL contract as an honorary member of the New Orleans Saints.

Upon his signing, then-Saints head coach Sean Payton said, “He is an outstanding young man, who is not only an inspiration to his coaches and teammates at Tulane, but to all of us. Devon’s character, determination, intelligence and work ethic are everything that we look for in a New Orleans Saint when we sign a player.”
