= Destrehan High School =

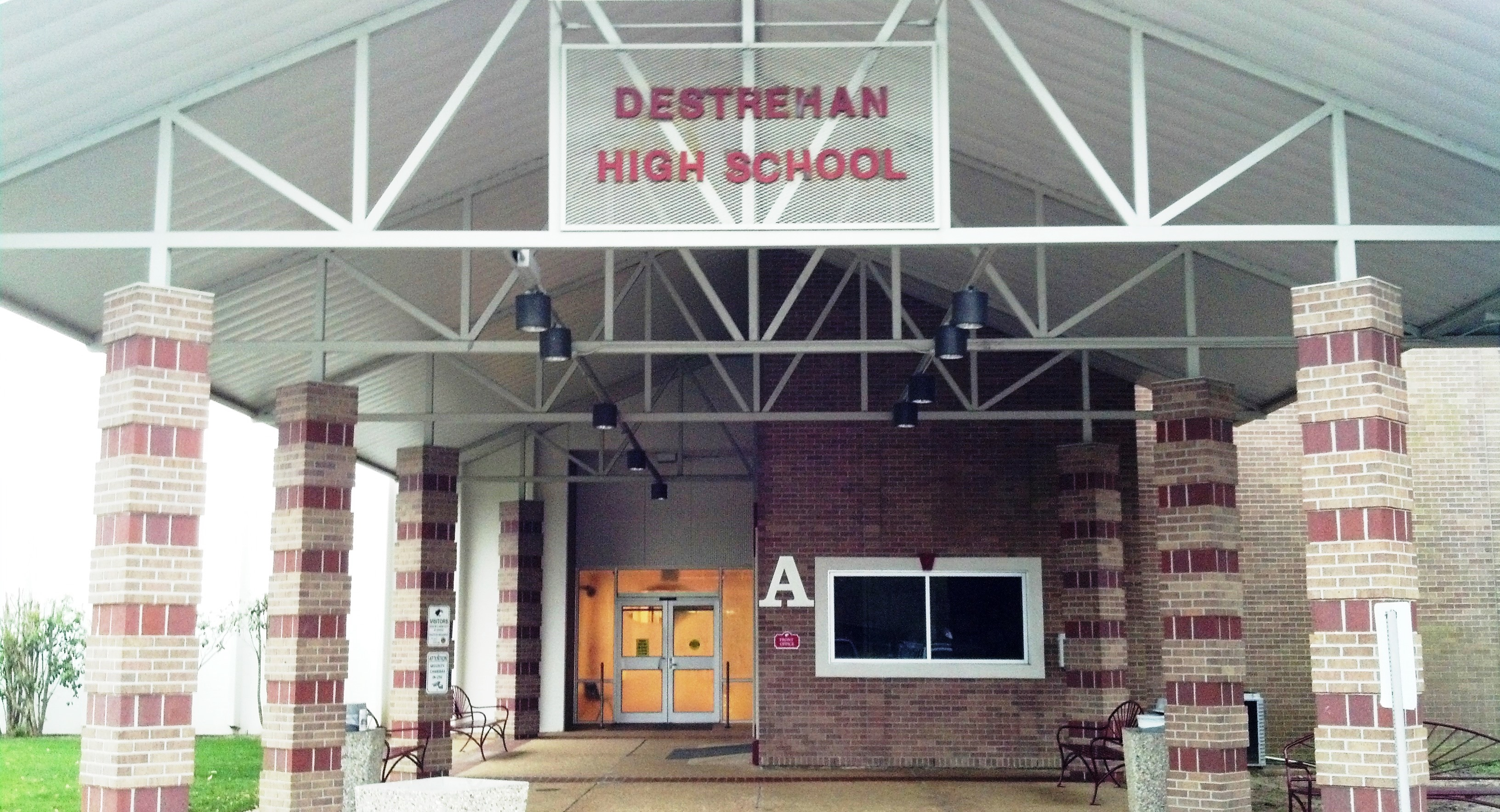

Location
- 1 Wildcat Lane; Destrehan, Louisiana 70047; United States; 29.964805°N 90.382693°W

Information
- School type: Public
- Established: 1924
- School district: St. Charles Parish Public School System
- Principal: Jason Madere
- Teaching staff: 116.82 (FTE)
- Grades: 9–12
- Gender: Co-Ed
- Enrollment: 1,497 (2023–2024)
- Student to teacher ratio: 12.81
- Campus type: Suburban
- Colors: Garnet and gray
- Athletics: Louisiana High School Athletic Association
- Athletics conference: District 7-5A
- Mascot: Wildcat
- Nickname: Fighting Wildcats
- Rival: Hahnville Tigers; East St. John Wildcats
- Yearbook: Remoulade
- Website: https://destrehan.wearescpps.org/

Destrehan High School is a public high school located in Destrehan, Louisiana, United States and is approximately twenty-five miles west of New Orleans. It is part of the St. Charles Parish Public School System and serves all students on the east bank of the Mississippi River from grades 9 through 12.

It serves the communities of Destrehan, Montz, New Sarpy, Norco, and St. Rose.

== History ==
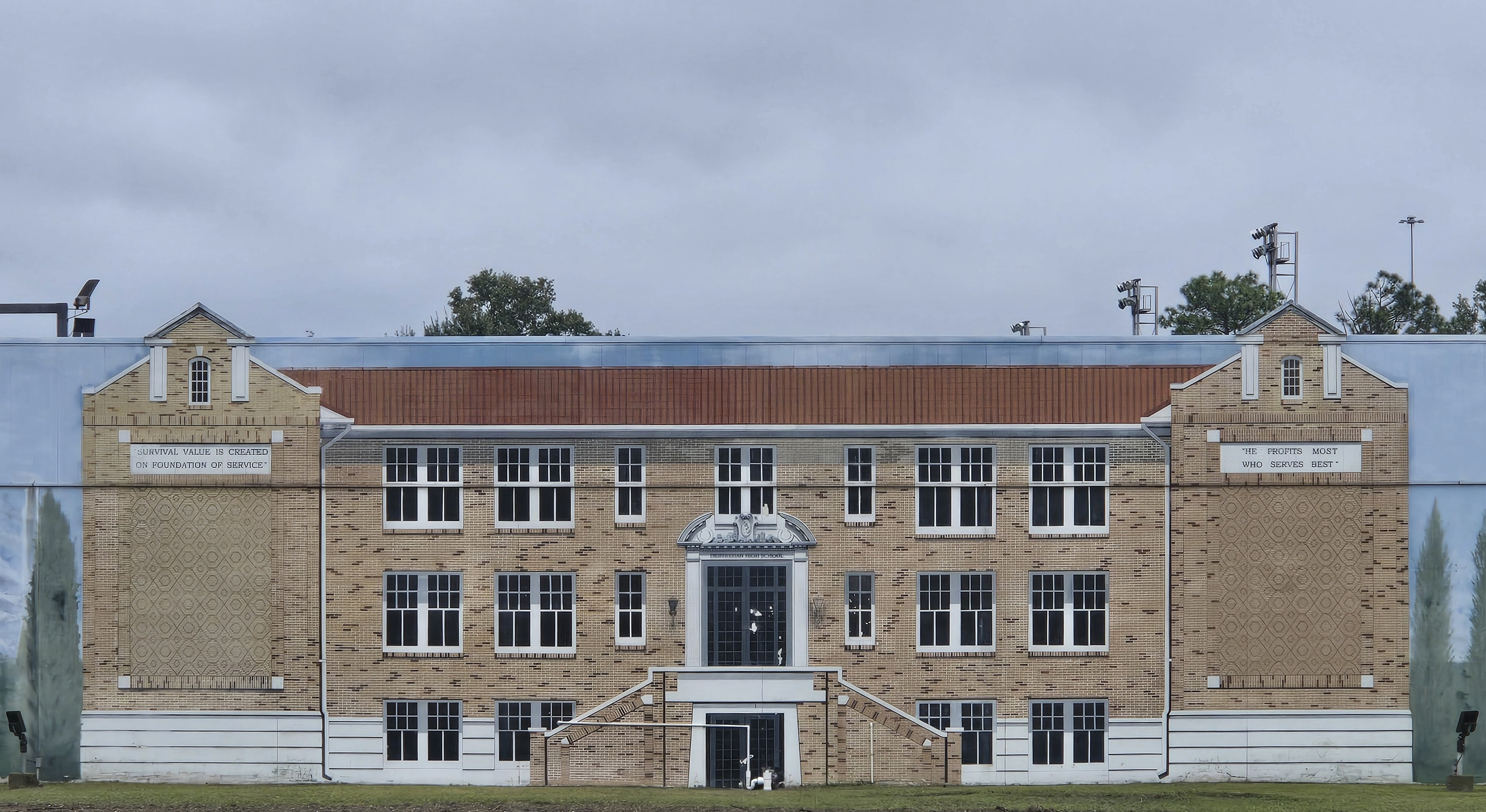
"Original" Destrehan High School Main Building Mural

In 1923, the Mexican Petroleum Company donated three and one half acres of property to the St. Charles Parish School Board for the construction of a high school. On August 7, 1923, the school board president accepted the donation and St. Charles Parish approved a bond issue for school construction. Destrehan High School was dedicated on September 15, 1924, and the facility received 234 pupils in grades one through eleven. The location of the original high school was on River Road, approximately 0.3 miles downriver from the St. Charles Borromeo Church on the current site of Harry Hurst Middle School. Destrehan's first graduating class consisted of Placide Hotard and Eldridge Gervais.

Destrehan football began eleven-man team play in 1946. In 1948, ground was broken on Destrehan High Stadium as the home for the football team. The 1,200-seat stadium, completed in 1949, was located behind the original high school main building and cost $18,000 to build. The Pan-American Petroleum Company donated the land to build the stadium.

A new Destrehan High Gymnasium was constructed on the Destrehan campus in 1954.

In 1969, then all-black Mary M. Bethune High School in Norco was closed. Elementary-aged children attended schools directed by court guidelines, and high school students moved to Destrehan High School.

The process of integrating the two student bodies caused several disruptions. On October 7, 1974, students were sent home early after racially motivated fights broke out in the school. Another incident between a bus full of black students and white parents and students resulted in 13-year-old Timothy Weber, who was standing outside with his mother, being shot. Gary Tyler, a black student, was arrested and later convicted of the murder. A federal appeals court ruled Tyler did not receive a fair trial, but he was never retried and remained in prison until his release in May 2016.

The original high school located on River Road closed after the completion of the 1974 school year. The new campus located at its current location on Wildcat Lane opened on November 16, 1975. In 1977, the original high school main building was damaged by fire and was later demolished.

In 1981, the Destrehan High School Athletic Field and Field House were completed on the new school campus. The athletic field was later renamed Fighting Wildcats Stadium.

Beginning in 2005, students in grades 11 and 12 from both Destrehan and Hahnville High School's have had the option to attend the school district's for half of the school day. The goal is for students to concentrate on career paths that are projected to expand the most over the next decade. Courses at the Satellite Center include: Advanced Television Broadcasting, Digital Media, Engineering Design, Interactive Media, Process Technology (PTEC), Health Care Exploration, Patient Care, Hotel-Restaurant and Tourism (HRT) Administration, Culinary Arts, and Students Teaching And Reaching (STAR). As of the 2018–2019 school year, the Satellite Center added courses in Instrumentation and Health Clinical. Thus, the courses of Digital Media, Interactive Media, and Advanced Television Broadcasting were moved into the academic wing of the school district's brand new Rodney Lafon Performing Arts Center less than a block away from the Satellite Center. Despite the move, these three courses are still considered a part of the Satellite Center.

In 2017, Destrehan High School was one of thirty high schools world-wide to be named "world-leading learners" and to receive a fellowship based on academic excellence, and reducing the achievement gap between racial and socioeconomic groups and innovation.

On August 29, 2021, the school suffered significant damage caused by Hurricane Ida. The roof of the main building, which houses the administrative offices, the library and auditorium, collapsed. Additional campus buildings including the gymnasium also received damage from the hurricane. The students attended Hahnville High School for an alternating-day schedule while repairs were being made. The school reopened on January 18, 2022.

In 2022, expansion and renovation of Wildcat Gymnasium was completed. The expansion increased seating capacity to 1,000 and a new auxiliary gym and elevated running track were built.

=== Classroom expansion ===
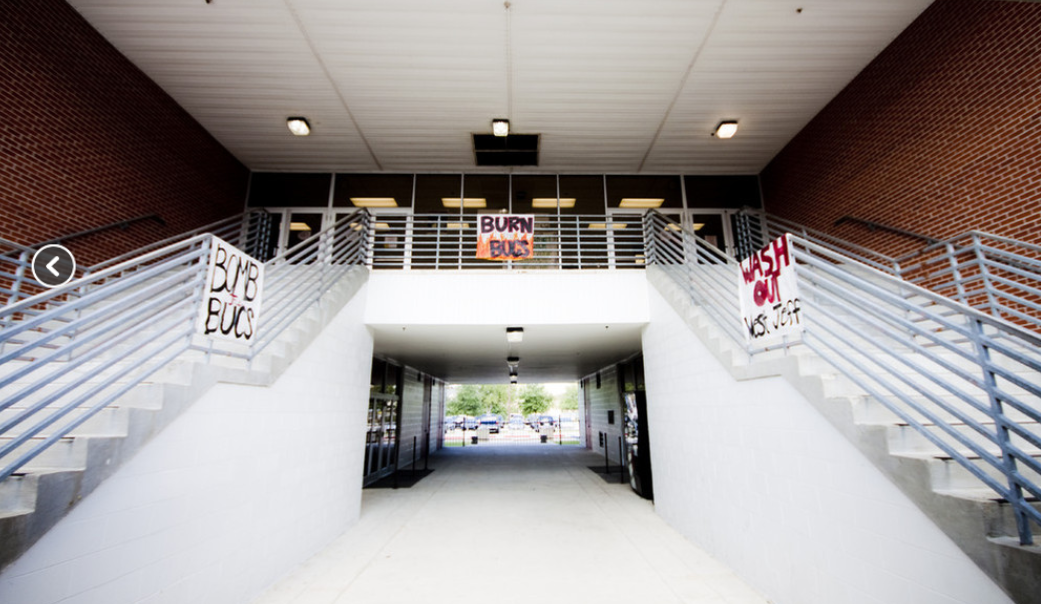
Building B (Humanities Building) breezeway

To accommodate for larger student bodies, the school has had numerous building additions and wing expansions.

The Mathematics Building (known today as "Building D") was completed in 1993. It is a one-story, t-shaped building with a total of 14 classrooms. It also added a new textbook storage room when it was built. Originally intended as a mathematics building, it now houses most sophomore core classes and some senior core classes. One of the classrooms has been converted to a staff lounge. The building is located (if facing from the main entrance) right of the softball field, left of the main building, in front of the JROTC building, and behind the Gym Building ("Building C").

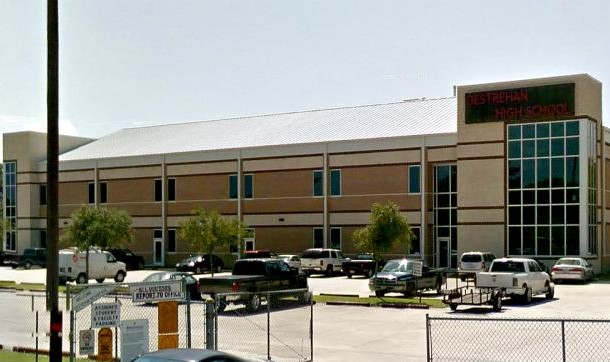
Building L

The JROTC Building (known today as "Building G") was completed in 1996. It was originally a two classroom building with two one-person restrooms. In 2014, the building was expanded adding two more one-person restrooms, a new office and a new drumline room. After removing the portable classrooms that Building L replaced, students in ROTC have access to a large yard space for practice. If facing the front, the building is located directly left of the shop buildings, right of the back field behind the "D" building and in front of the tennis court.

The Humanities Building (known today as "Building B") was completed in 2001. The building added roughly 25 new classrooms.

The newest building (known as "Building L") was completed in 2014. It added 17 new regular-sized classrooms and six specialty rooms.

== Athletics ==
The Destrehan High School athletic teams, known as the Fighting Wildcats and Lady Cats, compete in the Louisiana High School Athletic Association (LHSAA).

- Baseball
- Basketball (Co-ed)
- Cross Country (Co-ed)
- Football
- Golf (Co-ed)
- Soccer (Co-ed)
- Softball
- Swimming (Co-ed)
- Tennis (Co-ed)
- Track and Field (Co-ed)
- Volleyball
- Wrestling

=== Athletic facilities ===
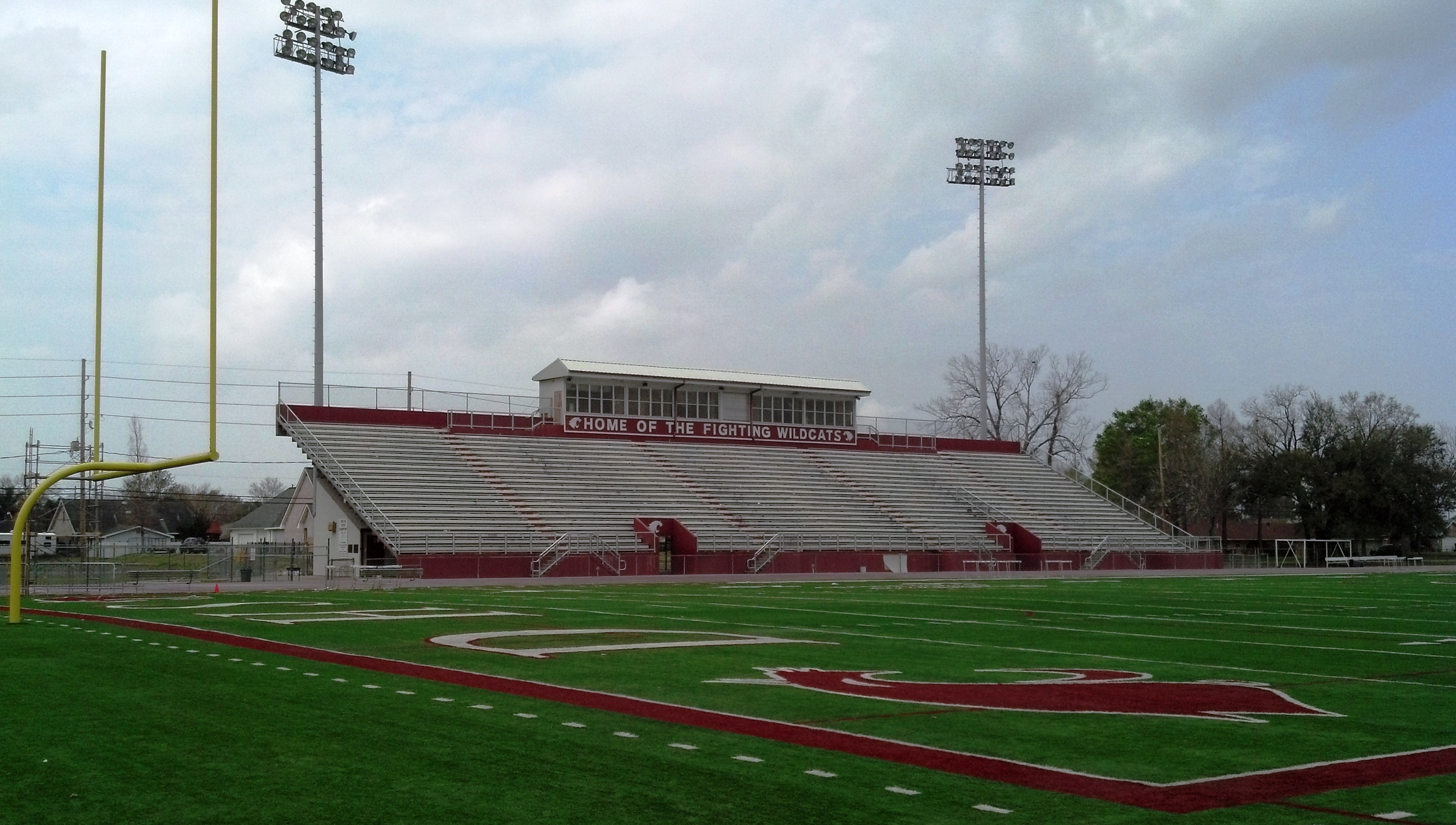
Fighting Wildcats Stadium

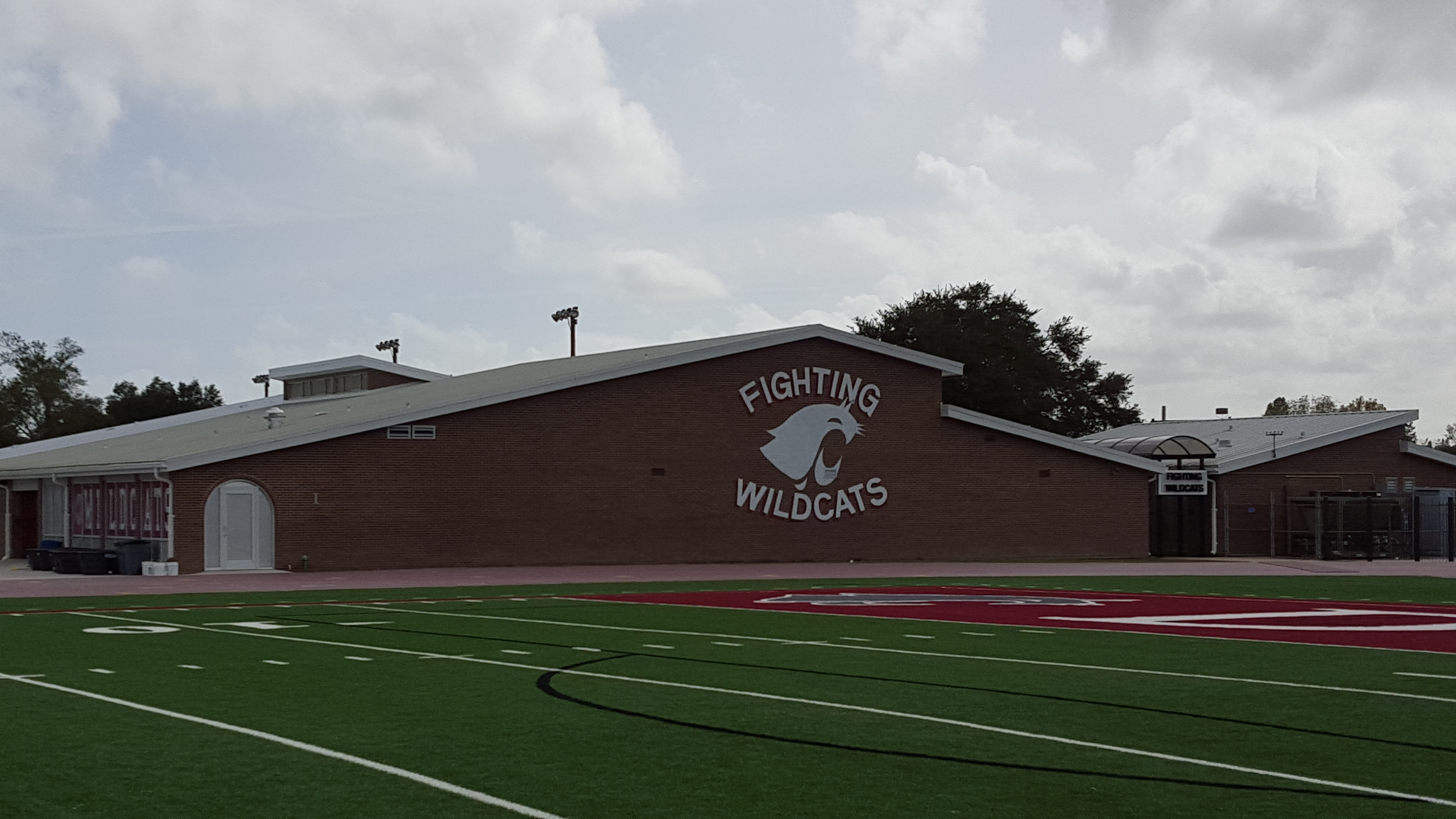
Fighting Wildcats Field House

Fighting Wildcats Field House-Strength and Conditioning Facility

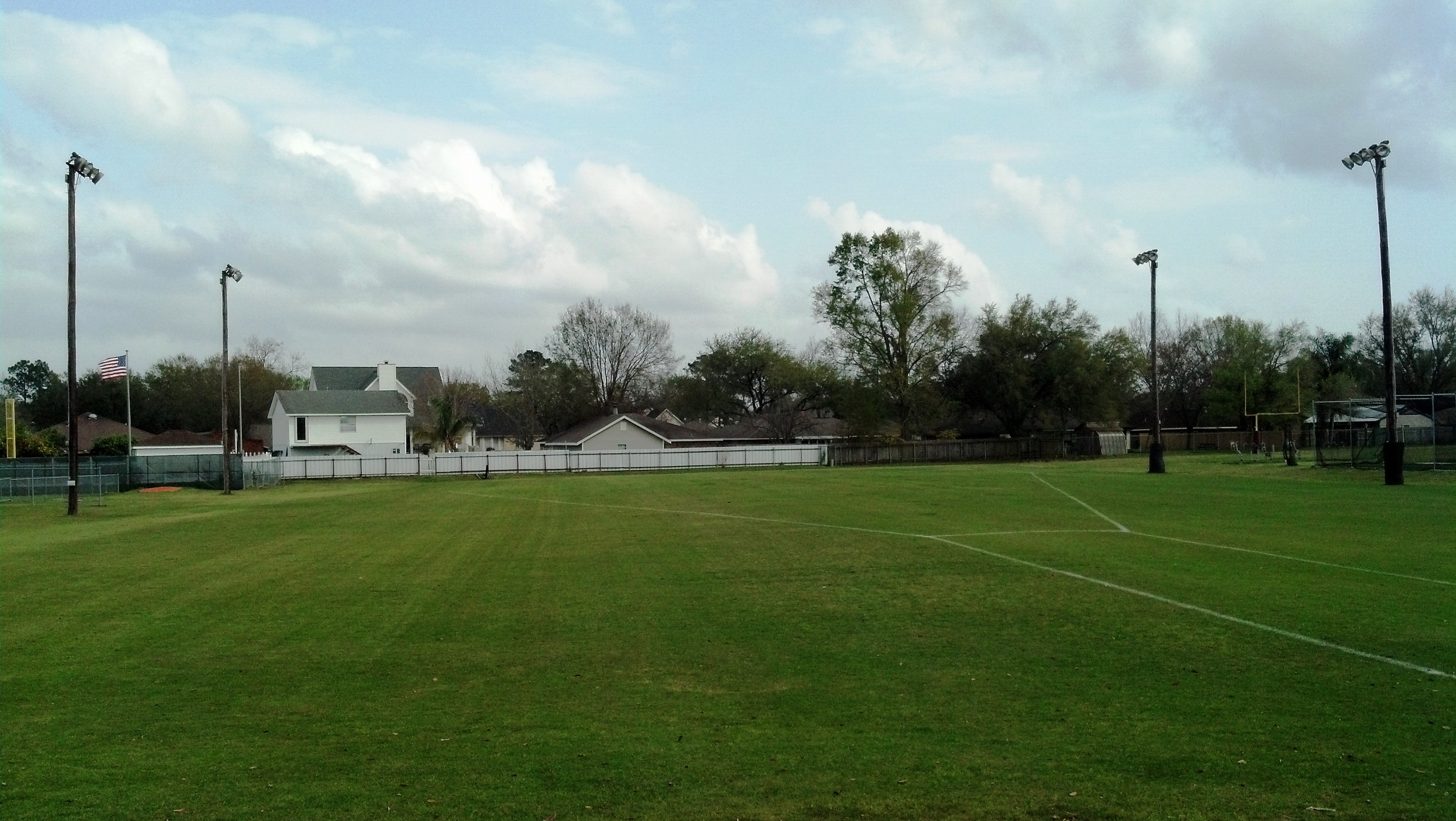
Fighting Wildcats Lighted Practice Complex

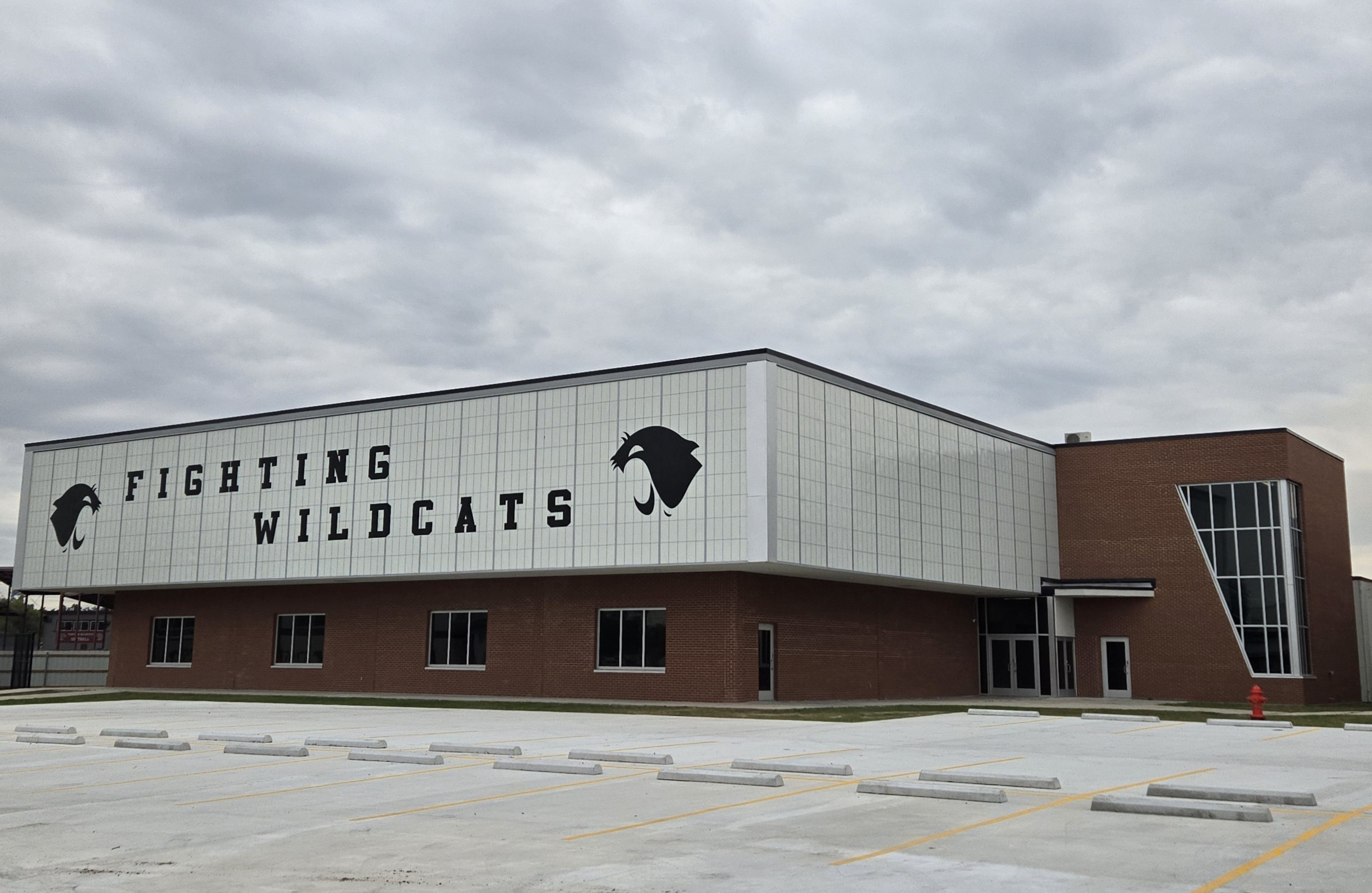
Fighting Wildcats Gymnasium

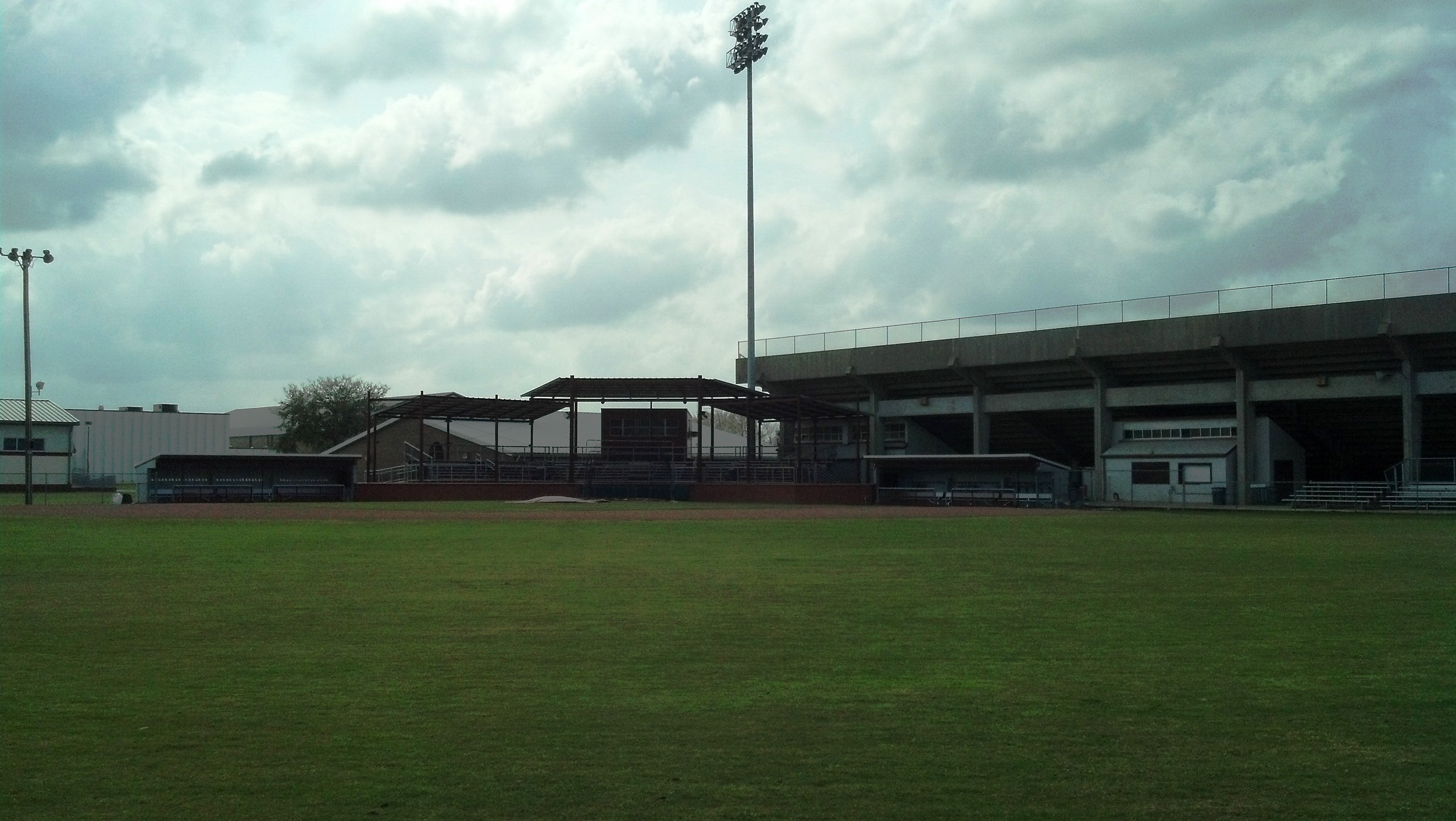
Fighting Wildcats Baseball Field

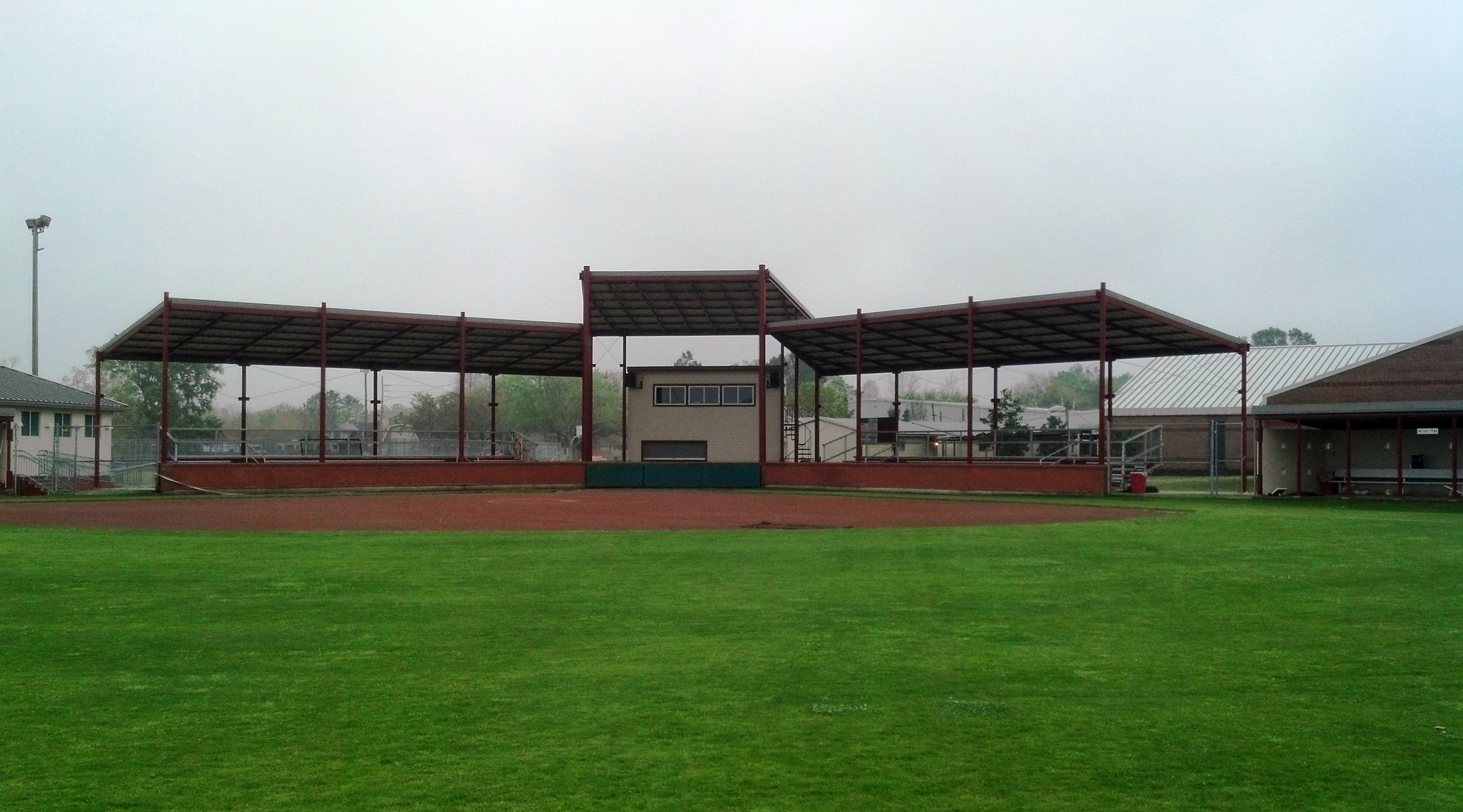
Lady Cats Softball Field

=== Football ===
The Destrehan Fighting Wildcats football team competes in District 7-5A in the LHSAA. The Fighting Wildcats play their home games at 5,000-seat Fighting Wildcats Stadium. They are coached by Marcus Scott.

==== State championships ====
- (6) Football championships: 1941, 1949, 1973, 2007, 2008, 2022

Championship history
The 2007 state championship team finished the season ranked 22nd in the nation and the 2008 state championship team finished the season ranked 18th in the nation. Those teams under head coach Stephen Robicheaux were part of a 30-game winning streak from 2007 to September 2009.

LHSAA State Championship Games
Year	Winning Team		Losing Team		Location	Class	Record	Head coach
1941	Destrehan					Six-man		
1949	Destrehan	14	DeQuincy	6		1A	12–1	Vane Wilson
1973	Destrehan	21	Lutcher	0	Lutcher, Louisiana	3A	12–0–1	Jessie Roussel
1993	West Monroe	28	Destrehan	21	Louisiana Superdome, New Orleans	5A	12–3	Tim Rebowe
2007	Destrehan	41	Acadiana	21	Louisiana Superdome, New Orleans	5A	15–0	Stephen Robicheaux
2008	Destrehan	14	West Monroe	3	Louisiana Superdome, New Orleans	5A	14–0	Stephen Robicheaux
2014	Acadiana	23	Destrehan	7	Mercedes-Benz Superdome, New Orleans	5A	14–1	Stephen Robicheaux
2019	Acadiana	8	Destrehan	3	Mercedes-Benz Superdome, New Orleans	5A	11–4	Stephen Robicheaux
2022	Destrehan	17	Ruston	10	Caesars Superdome, New Orleans	5A	14-0	Marcus Scott

The Fighting Wildcats have won twenty-eight LHSAA district championships: 1949, 1958, 1963, 1972, 1973, 1974, 1981, 1991, 1996, 1997, 1998, 1999, 2001, 2002, 2007, 2008, 2013, 2014, 2015, 2016, 2018, 2019, 2020, 2021, 2022, 2023, 2024, 2025, 2026

The Fighting Wildcats have made the LHSAA playoffs forty-seven times: 1941, 1949, 1958, 1963, 1969, 1971, 1972, 1973, 1974, 1976, 1981, 1983, 1984, 1985, 1988, 1989, 1990, 1991, 1992, 1993, 1996, 1997, 1998, 1999, 2000, 2001, 2002, 2003, 2004, 2005, 2006, 2007, 2008, 2009, 2013, 2014, 2015, 2016, 2017, 2018, 2019, 2020, 2021, 2022, 2023, 2024, 2025, 2026

=== Baseball ===
The Destrehan Fighting Wildcats baseball team competes in District 7-5A in the LHSAA. The Fighting Wildcats play their home games at Fighting Wildcats Baseball Field. They are coached by Christopher Mire.

==== State championships ====
- (2) Baseball championships: 1955, 1964

LHSAA State Championship Games
Year	Winning Team		Losing Team		Location	Class	Record
1955	Destrehan					1A	
1956	Hahnville	2	Destrehan	0		1A	
1964	Destrehan		Farmerville			1A	
2003	East Ascension	10	Destrehan	6	Acadian Park, New Iberia	5A	
2005	Jesuit	8	Destrehan	2	Zephyr Field, Metairie	5A	

=== Boys' basketball ===
The Destrehan Fighting Wildcats basketball team competes in District 7-5A in the LHSAA. The Fighting Wildcats play their home games at Fighting Wildcats Gymnasium. They are coached by Khary Carrell.

=== Girls' basketball ===
The Destrehan Lady Cats basketball team competes in District 7-5A in the LHSAA. The Lady Cats play their home games at Fighting Wildcats Gymnasium. They are coached by Twalla Powell.

==== State championships ====
- (1) Girls' basketball championship: 2017

LHSAA State Championship Games
Year	Winning Team		Losing Team		Location	Class	Record
2014	Mount Carmel	69	Destrehan	60	Burton Coliseum, Lake Charles	5A	31–2
2017	Destrehan	62	Barbe	57	University Center, Hammond	5A	35–0

=== Track and field ===
The Destrehan Fighting Wildcats and Lady Cats track and field teams compete in District 7-5A in the LHSAA. Home track meets are held at Wildcat Stadium.

==== State championships ====
- (1) Boys' track and field championship: 1971

LHSAA State Championship Meet
Year	State Champion	Location	Class
1971	Destrehan		3A

== Band ==
The Pride of Destrehan Fighting Wildcat Band is the name of the band representing the school.

The ensemble has earned superior ratings at the Louisiana Showcase of Marching Bands, earning 9th place overall in 2011, 8th place overall in 2012, and 4th place overall in 2014, as well as a score of 86.83, and in 2018 their Drum Major was given the title of Best Drum Major of the Day at the competition. The program has gone on to earn superior awards in Marching Band, Concert Band, and their Indoor Percussion ensemble, which earned 3rd place in the Scholastic A Class at the 2024 LMCGPC Indoor Percussion Championships.

== Notable alumni ==
=== Arts and entertainment ===
- Shelley Hennig, actress and Miss Teen USA

=== Athletics ===
- Paul F. Boudreau, NFL and CFL assistant coach
- Macon Clark, NFL safety
- Burnell Dent, NFL linebacker
- Donovan Isom, professional football quarterback
- Jordan Jefferson, NFL quarterback
- Justin Jefferson, NFL wide receiver
- Damaris Johnson, NFL wide receiver/punt returner
- Jamall Johnson, NFL linebacker and actor
- Glen Logan, NFL defensive tackle
- Damon Mason, AFL defensive back and AFL assistant coach
- Rondell Mealey, NFL running back
- Kirk Merritt, NFL wide receiver
- Trey Montgomery, American basketball coach
- Jerico Nelson, NFL safety
- Jeremy Parquet, NFL offensive lineman
- Rusty Rebowe, NFL linebacker
- Tim Rebowe, head football coach at Nicholls State University
- Ed Reed, NFL safety and NFL assistant coach; Member of the NFL Hall of Fame and College Football Hall of Fame
- Darryl Richard, NFL defensive tackle
- Mike Scifres, NFL punter
- Darrington Sentimore, NFL defensive end
- Chipper Simon, head football coach
- Josh Victorian, NFL cornerback
- Darius Vinnett, NFL cornerback
- Devon Walker, safety for Tulane University and New Orleans Saints
- Michael Young Jr., NFL wide receiver

=== Elected officials and judiciary ===
- Joel T. Chaisson, II, Louisiana State Senate president and district attorney
- Gary Smith Jr., Louisiana state senator

== See also ==
- List of high schools in Louisiana
