= Kirk Merritt =

American football player (born 1997)

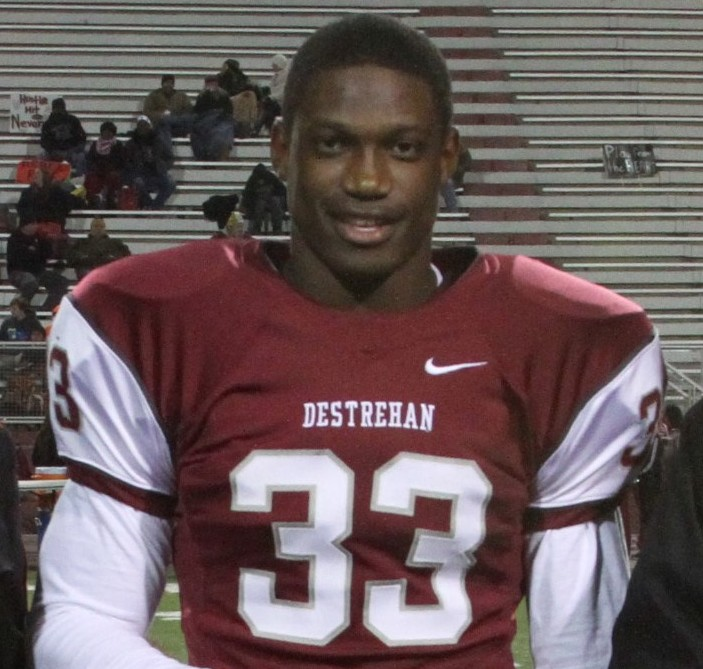

No. 22 – Dallas Renegades
- Positions: Running back Wide receiver
- Roster status: Active

Personal information
- Born: January 5, 1997 (age 29); New Orleans, Louisiana, U.S.
- Listed height: 6 ft 1 in (1.85 m)
- Listed weight: 215 lb (98 kg)

Career information
- High school: Destrehan (Destrehan, Louisiana)
- College: Oregon (2015); Texas A&M (2016); East Mississippi CC (2017); Arkansas State (2018–2019)
- NFL draft: 2020: undrafted

Career history
- Miami Dolphins (2020–2021); New Orleans Saints (2022–2023); Houston Roughnecks / Gamblers (2024–2026); Dallas Renegades (2027–present)

Awards and highlights
- 2× All-Sun Belt (2018, 2019)

Career NFL statistics as of 2023
- Receptions: 1
- Receiving yards: 13
- Receiving touchdowns: 0
- Stats at Pro Football Reference

Kirk Merritt (born January 5, 1997) is an American professional football running back and wide receiver for the Dallas Renegades of the United Football League (UFL). He played college football at Arkansas State.

== Early life ==
Merritt grew up in Destrehan, Louisiana, and attended Destrehan High School. He gained a combined 1,058 rushing and receiving yards and scored 11 total touchdowns as a senior. Merritt was rated a four-star recruit and committed to play college football at Oregon over offers from Alabama, Auburn, and Texas A&M.

== College career ==
Merritt began his collegiate career at the University of Oregon. He played in 12 games for the Ducks as a freshman and caught five passes for 61 yards and rushed three times for 13 yards. Merritt left the program after his freshman year.

Merritt later transferred to Texas A&M. Merritt sat out the 2016 season due to NCAA transfer rules. He was dismissed from the team in April 2017, after being charged for two separate cases of indecent exposure. Following his dismissal, Merritt transferred to East Mississippi Community College. He caught 52 passes for 628 yards and four touchdowns in his lone season with the Lions and committed to transfer to Arkansas State University for his final two years of eligibility.

Merritt became an immediate starter for the Red Wolves and was named first-team All-Sun Belt Conference after leading the conference with 83 receptions and 1,005 receiving yards while also catching seven touchdowns. He repeated as a first-team All-Sun Belt selection as a redshirt senior after finishing the season with 70 receptions for 806 yards and 12 touchdowns.

== Professional career ==
Pre-draft measurables
Height	Weight	Arm length	Hand span	Wingspan
5 ft 11 5/8 in (1.82 m)	208 lb (94 kg)	32 1/4 in (0.82 m)	10 1/4 in (0.26 m)	6 ft 5 3/4 in (1.97 m)
All values from Pro Day

=== Miami Dolphins ===
Merritt was signed by the Miami Dolphins as an undrafted free agent on April 25, 2020. He was waived on September 4, 2020, during final roster cuts, but was signed to the team's practice squad on September 6. He was elevated to the active roster on November 7 for the team's week 9 game against the Arizona Cardinals, and reverted to the practice squad after the game. He was placed on the practice squad/COVID-19 list by the team on December 15, 2020, and restored to the practice squad three days later. He was elevated to the active roster again on December 31 for the week 17 game against the Buffalo Bills, and reverted to the practice squad again following the game. He signed a reserve/future contract with the Dolphins on January 6, 2021.

On August 31, 2021, Merritt was waived by the Dolphins and re-signed to the practice squad the next day.

=== New Orleans Saints ===
On January 24, 2022, Merritt signed a reserve/future contract with the New Orleans Saints. He was waived on August 30, and signed to the practice squad the next day. He was promoted to the active roster on December 23.

On September 19, 2023, Merritt was waived by the Saints and re-signed to the practice squad. On September 26, Merritt was cut from the Saints' practice squad.

=== Houston Roughnecks ===
On January 26, 2024, Merritt signed with the Houston Roughnecks of the United Football League (UFL) as a running back. He was placed on injured reserve on April 17. Merritt was activated on May 31. He re-signed with the team on August 19.
