= Glen Logan =

American football player (born 1998)

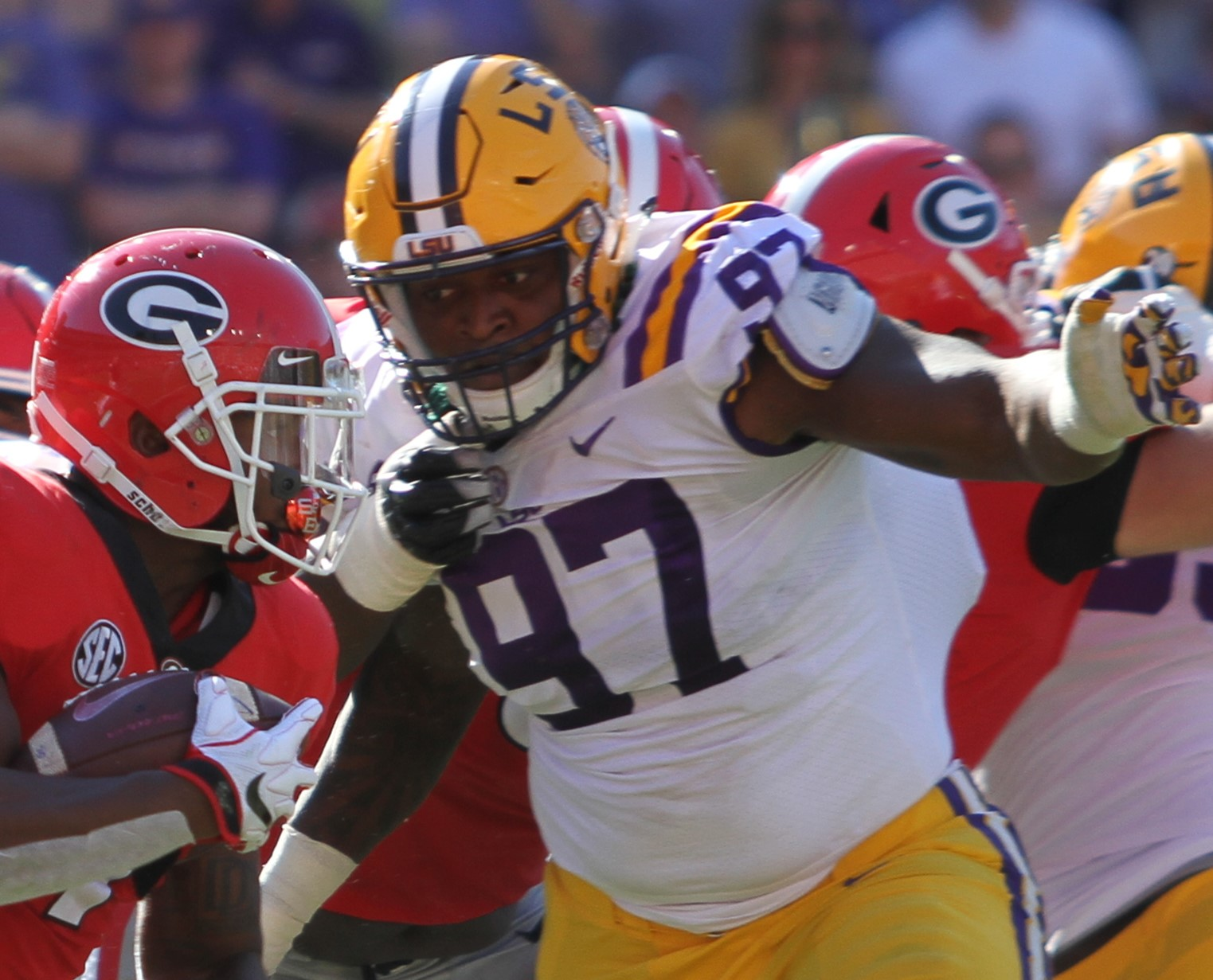
- Logan with LSU in 2018

Marietta Pioneers
- Title: Defensive line coach

Personal information
- Born: March 26, 1998 (age 28); Kenner, Louisiana, U.S.
- Listed height: 6 ft 3 in (1.91 m)
- Listed weight: 298 lb (135 kg)

Career information
- Position: Defensive tackle
- High school: Destrehan (LA)
- College: LSU
- NFL draft: 2022: undrafted

Career history

Playing
- Cleveland Browns (2022)*; Arlington Renegades (2023)*; Houston Roughnecks (2023); Houston Roughnecks (2024–2025)
- * Offseason or practice squad member only

Coaching
- Marietta (2026–present) Defensive line coach

Awards and highlights
- CFP national champion (2019)

Glen Logan (born March 26, 1998) is an American college football coach and former professional defensive tackle. He is the defensive line coach for Marietta College, a position he has held since 2026. He played college football at LSU.

== Early life ==
Logan played football at Destrehan High School in Destrehan, Louisiana under head coach Stephen Robicheaux, where he played defensive tackle. He earned All-USA Louisiana First-team defense honors and also first-team Louisiana 5A all-state honors his senior season, while recording 54.5 tackles, 5.5 tackles for loss, and four sacks. He was a consensus four-star pick by 247Sports, ESPN, Rivals.com, and Scout.com. Rivals rated Logan as the nation's number sixty-nine overall prospect, the number seven defensive tackle in the nation, and the number two overall player in Louisiana.

== College career ==
Logan played defensive tackle at LSU for six-seasons from 2016 to 2021 appearing in fifty-one games with thirty-seven starts. He was a five-year letterwinner and four-year starter on the defensive line for the Tigers. He redshirted his freshman year in 2016 and was granted a sixth year of eligibility in 2021 due to NCAA rules changes caused by the COVID-19 pandemic. Logan finished his career with 110 tackles, 10.0 tackles for loss, and 7.0 sacks and won a national championship with LSU during his 2019 junior season.

== Professional career ==
Pre-draft measurables
| Height | Weight | Arm length | Hand span | 40-yard dash | 10-yard split | 20-yard split | 20-yard shuttle | Three-cone drill | Vertical jump | Broad jump | Bench press |
|---|---|---|---|---|---|---|---|---|---|---|---|
| 6 ft 2 3/4 in (1.90 m) | 298 lb (135 kg) | 34 1/4 in (0.87 m) | 9 3/4 in (0.25 m) | 5.07 s | 1.76 s | 2.85 s | 4.75 s | 7.89 s | 27.5 in (0.70 m) | 9 ft 2 in (2.79 m) | 18 reps |
All values from Pro Day

Logan went undrafted in the 2022 NFL draft.

=== Cleveland Browns ===
Logan was signed by the Cleveland Browns as an undrafted free agent following the 2022 NFL Draft. Logan was waived by the Browns on August 29, 2022.

=== Arlington Renegades ===
Logan was selected by the Arlington Renegades in the 2023 XFL draft.

=== Houston Roughnecks (XFL) ===
Logan was traded to the Roughnecks in January 2023. The Roughnecks brand was transferred to the Houston Gamblers when the XFL and USFL merged to create the United Football League (UFL) and the XFL's Roughnecks folded.

=== Houston Roughnecks (UFL) ===
On January 15, 2024, Logan was selected by the new Houston Roughnecks in the second round of the Super Draft portion of the 2024 UFL dispersal draft. He signed with the team on January 23. He re-signed with the Roughnecks on August 20, 2024.

== Professional wrestling ==
=== WWE ===
On December 8, 2021, it was reported that Logan signed a Name, Image and Likeness (NIL) agreement with World Wrestling Entertainment, Inc (WWE). He was one of fifteen athletes to become part of the WWE's "Next in Line" program, which was established to develop potential future superstars and enhance WWE's talent development process. The program features access to the WWE Performance Center in addition to other resources across the organization. Following the completion of the program, the athlete may be offered a WWE contract.
