= National Register of Historic Places listings in St. Charles Parish, Louisiana =

Location of St. Charles Parish in Louisiana

This is a list of the National Register of Historic Places listings in St. Charles Parish, Louisiana.

This is intended to be a complete list of the properties and districts on the National Register of Historic Places in St. Charles Parish, Louisiana, United States. The locations of National Register properties and districts for which the latitude and longitude coordinates are included below, may be seen in a map.

There are 7 properties and districts listed on the National Register in the parish, including 1 National Historic Landmark.

This National Park Service list is complete through NPS recent listings posted December 12, 2025.

== Current listings ==
	Name on the Register	Image	Date listed	Location	City or town	Description
1	Destrehan Plantation	Destrehan Plantation	March 20, 1973 (#73002132)	River Rd. (Louisiana Highway 48); 29°56′43″N 90°21′55″W	Destrehan	Completed in 1790, the site of one of three tribunals which tried and executed slaves after the 1811 German Coast Uprising, the largest slave rebellion in U.S. history; this occurred during the Orleans Territorial period, about eighteen months before Louisiana statehood. The house and grounds have been restored by a nonprofit organization and are open to the public.
2	Dorvin House	Dorvin House	May 24, 1990 (#90000799)	Louisiana Highway 18 northwest of Hahnville; 29°59′18″N 90°25′15″W	Hahnville	
3	Homeplace Plantation House	Homeplace Plantation House	April 15, 1970 (#70000842)	Louisiana Highway 18, 0.5 miles south of Hahnville; 29°58′12″N 90°24′32″W	Hahnville	Built circa 1790, large French Colonial raised cottage. Not open to the public.
4	Kenner and Kugler Cemeteries Archeological District		October 16, 1987 (#87001762)	Address Restricted	Norco	
5	LaBranche Plantation Dependency	LaBranche Plantation Dependency	October 18, 1984 (#84000145)	River Rd. (Louisiana Highway 48); 29°57′00″N 90°18′58″W	St. Rose	
6	Odd Fellows Hall	Odd Fellows Hall	December 5, 2019 (#100004730)	224 Shaw St. 29°58′32″N 90°24′35″W	Hahnville	
7	Ormond Plantation House	Ormond Plantation House	November 8, 1990 (#90001748)	River Rd. (Louisiana Highway 48); 29°57′15″N 90°23′13″W	Destrehan	

== See also ==
- List of National Historic Landmarks in Louisiana
- National Register of Historic Places listings in Louisiana
