= Francois Cousin House =

Francois Cousin House may refer to:

- Francois Cousin House (Lacombe, Louisiana), on Main Street, listed on the NRHP in St. Tammany Parish, Louisiana
- Francois Cousin House (Slidell, Louisiana), on Gwin Road, listed on the NRHP in St. Tammany Parish, Louisiana
