= List of the oldest buildings in Louisiana =

This article lists the oldest extant buildings in Louisiana, including extant buildings and structures constructed prior to and during the United States rule over Louisiana. Only buildings built prior to 1800 are suitable for inclusion on this list, or the building must be the oldest of its type.

In order to qualify for the list, a structure must:

- be a recognizable building (defined as any human-made structure used or intended for supporting or sheltering any use or continuous occupancy);
- incorporate features of building work from the claimed date to at least 1.5 metres (4.9 ft) in height and/or be a listed building.

This consciously excludes ruins of limited height, roads and statues. Bridges may be included if they otherwise fulfill the above criteria. Dates for many of the oldest structures have been arrived at by radiocarbon dating or dendrochronology and should be considered approximate. If the exact year of initial construction is estimated, it will be shown as a range of dates.

== List of oldest buildings ==
Building	Image	Location	First built	Use	Notes
Lafitte's Blacksmith Shop		New Orleans, Louisiana	ca. 1722-1732	Blacksmith shop/bar	Located on Bourbon Street, where it is currently a bar. Built prior to 1803 Louisiana Purchase made New Orleans part of USA
Parlange Plantation House		Pointe Coupee Parish, Louisiana	1750	House	French colonial antebellum mansion
Old Ursuline Convent Museum		New Orleans, Louisiana	1751	Church convent	
St. Gabriel Roman Catholic Church		St. Gabriel, Louisiana	1772-1776	Church	The oldest church building in Louisiana and the entirety of the old Louisiana Purchase territory.
Francois Cousin House		Slidell, Louisiana	1778-1790	House	French Creole Cottage
Murphy Trading House		Natchitoches, Louisiana	1786 or earlier	French Colonial Cottage	Early example of Bousillage Construction, Former Trading House on the Northern edge of the Louisiana Frontier, in Natchitoches
Destrehan Plantation		New Orleans, Louisiana	1787-90	House	French colonial antebellum mansion
Homeplace Plantation House		Hahnville, Louisiana	1787-1791	House	French colonial cottage on south side of Mississippi Riever
Madame John’s Legacy		New Orleans, Louisiana	1789	House	Example of Creole architecture
St. Louis Cathedral (New Orleans)		New Orleans, Louisiana	1789-1796	Church	Oldest cathedral in Louisiana; built on site of an earlier destroyed church
Armand Broussard House		Lafayette, Louisiana	1790	Residence	Oldest surviving Cajun house; relocated to Vermilionville Historic Village
Germain Bergeron House		Baton Rouge, Louisiana	1790-1805	Residence	In 2005 moved to the Rural Life Museum from east bank of Bayou Lafourche
The Presbytère		New Orleans, Louisiana	1791	Residence	Casas Curial or “Ecclesiastical House," which became a courthouse in 1834
Magnolia Mound Plantation House		Baton Rouge, Louisiana	1791	Residence	Oldest house in Baton Rouge
Napoleon House		New Orleans, Louisiana	1794	Residence	Napoleon was invited to reside there
Bartolome Bosque House		New Orleans, Louisiana	1795	Residence	Located in 617 Chartres St, New Orleans, LA 70130
Brennan's		New Orleans, Louisiana	1795	Residence	Former bank, now a restaurant in the French Quarter, located at 417 Royal Street, New Orleans, LA 70130
The Cabildo		New Orleans, Louisiana	1795-1799	Government	Located in Jackson Square
Pitot House		New Orleans, Louisiana	1799	Residence	1440 Moss St.,

== See also ==
- National Register of Historic Places listings in Louisiana
- History of Louisiana
- Oldest buildings in the United States
