= Ormond Plantation House =

Historic house in Louisiana, United States

- U.S. National Register of Historic Places
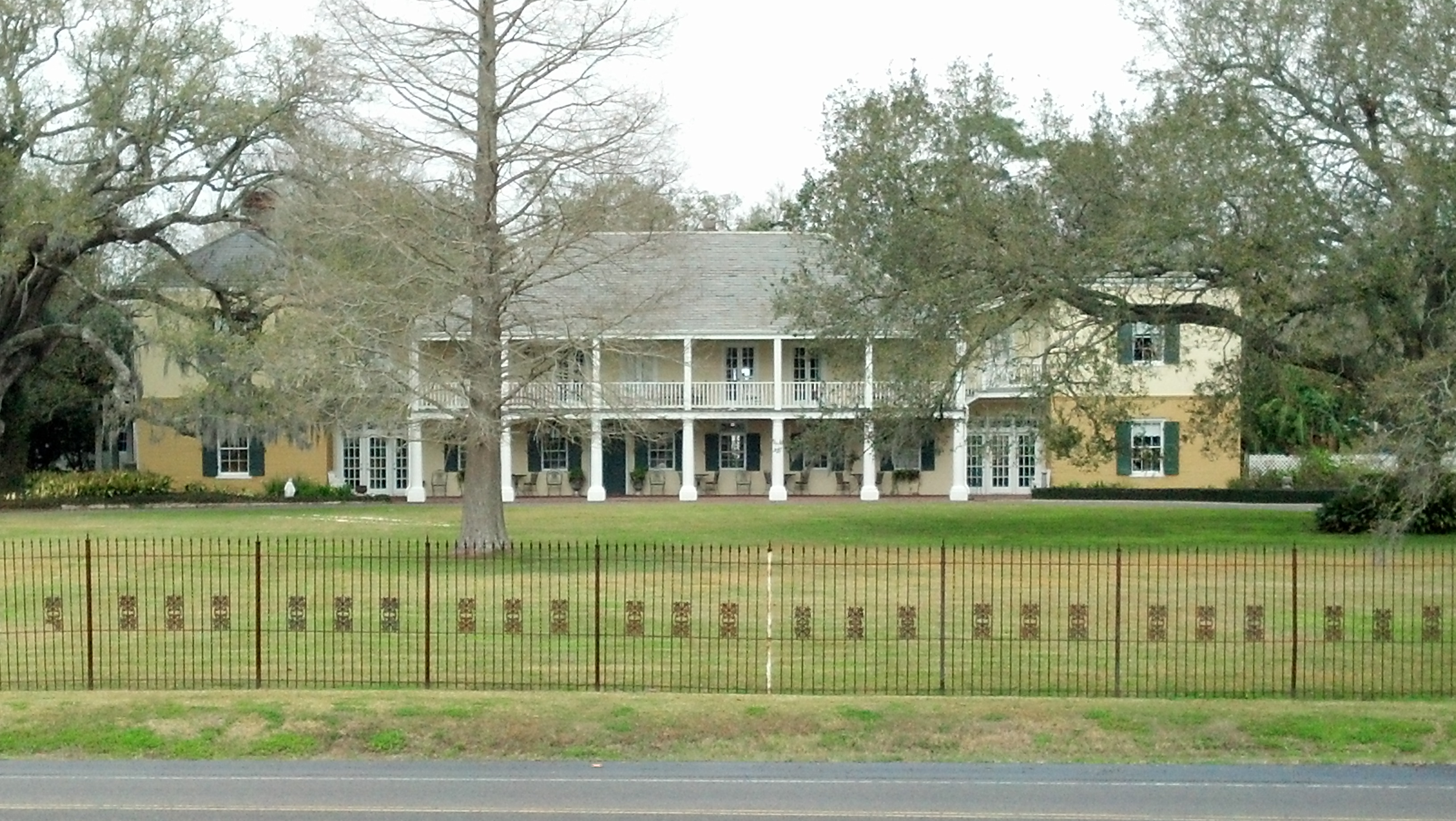
- Ormond Plantation House

- Location within Louisiana Location within the United States
- Location: River Rd. (LA 48), Destrehan, Louisiana
- Coordinates: 29°57′15″N 90°23′13″W
- Built: 1789
- Architectural style: French Colonial, West Indies style
- NRHP reference No.: 90001748
- Added to NRHP: November 8, 1990

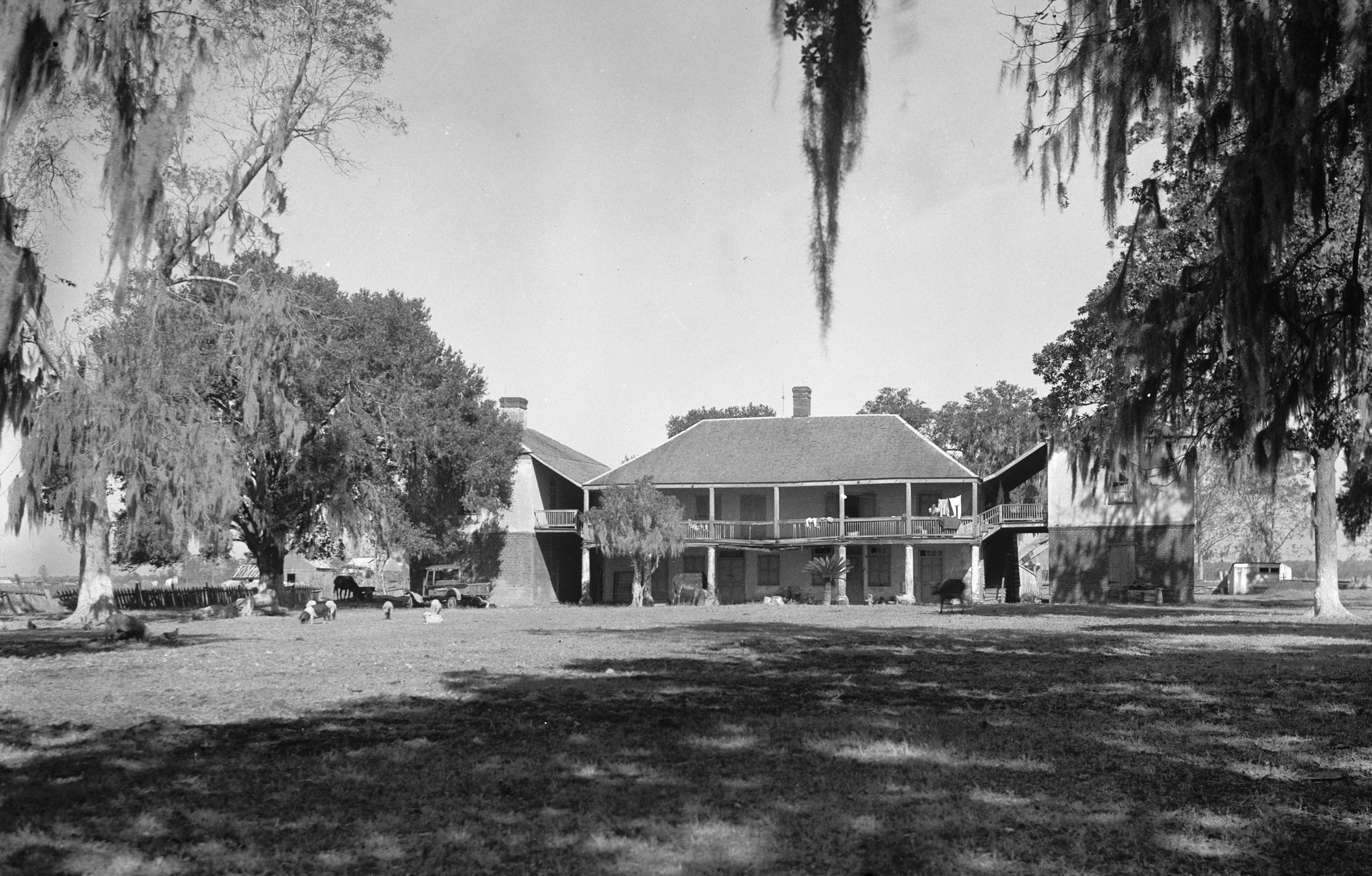
Ormond Plantation House

The Ormond Plantation House is a French Colonial-style, Creole plantation house located in Destrehan, St. Charles Parish, Louisiana, United States.

The house was built in the late 18th century, using bricks between cypress studs. This type of construction, called briquettes entre poteaux or "brick between posts," was used on the front and rear walls, with a type of adobe filling on the side walls. Rounded cement and brick columns supported the front veranda, or gallery, with wood columns on the second floor supporting the roof.

== History ==
The builder and first owner of the house was sugar baron and slave owner, Pierre Trepagnier, who in the early 1780s was awarded a tract of land between Lake Pontchartrain and the Mississippi River by Spanish Governor Don Bernardo de Galvez, in recognition of Trepagnier's service in subduing the British at Natchez as an officer in the Louisiana Militia during the American Revolutionary War. The manor house was completed shortly before 1789 (or 1780) and occupied by Mr. and Mrs. Trepagnier (née Elizabeth Reynaud, m. 1777) and their eight children. The family grew indigo and then sugarcane on the property.

There have been a handful of mysterious occurrences at Ormond Plantation. The first involved Mr. Trepagnier himself in 1798 when he was summoned from a family meal by a servant to notify him of a coach outside with a Spanish insignia. The servant was reported to have seen him meet a gentleman who was supposedly dressed in the clothing of a Spanish official. When the servant checked back, Trepagnier, the man and his coach had vanished and were never seen again.

On June 25, 1805, Colonel Richard Butler, son of William Butler and nephew of American Revolutionary War heroes the Fighting Butlers bought the plantation home and land from Trepagnier's widow. He named the house Ormond, after his ancestral home, the Ormonde Castle in Carrick-on-Suir, County Tipperary, Ireland. In August 1809, Butler became a business partner with Captain Samuel McCutchon, a slave owner, merchant and sailor originally from Pennsylvania. Samuel McCutcheon was married to Richard Butler's sister Rebecca Butler.

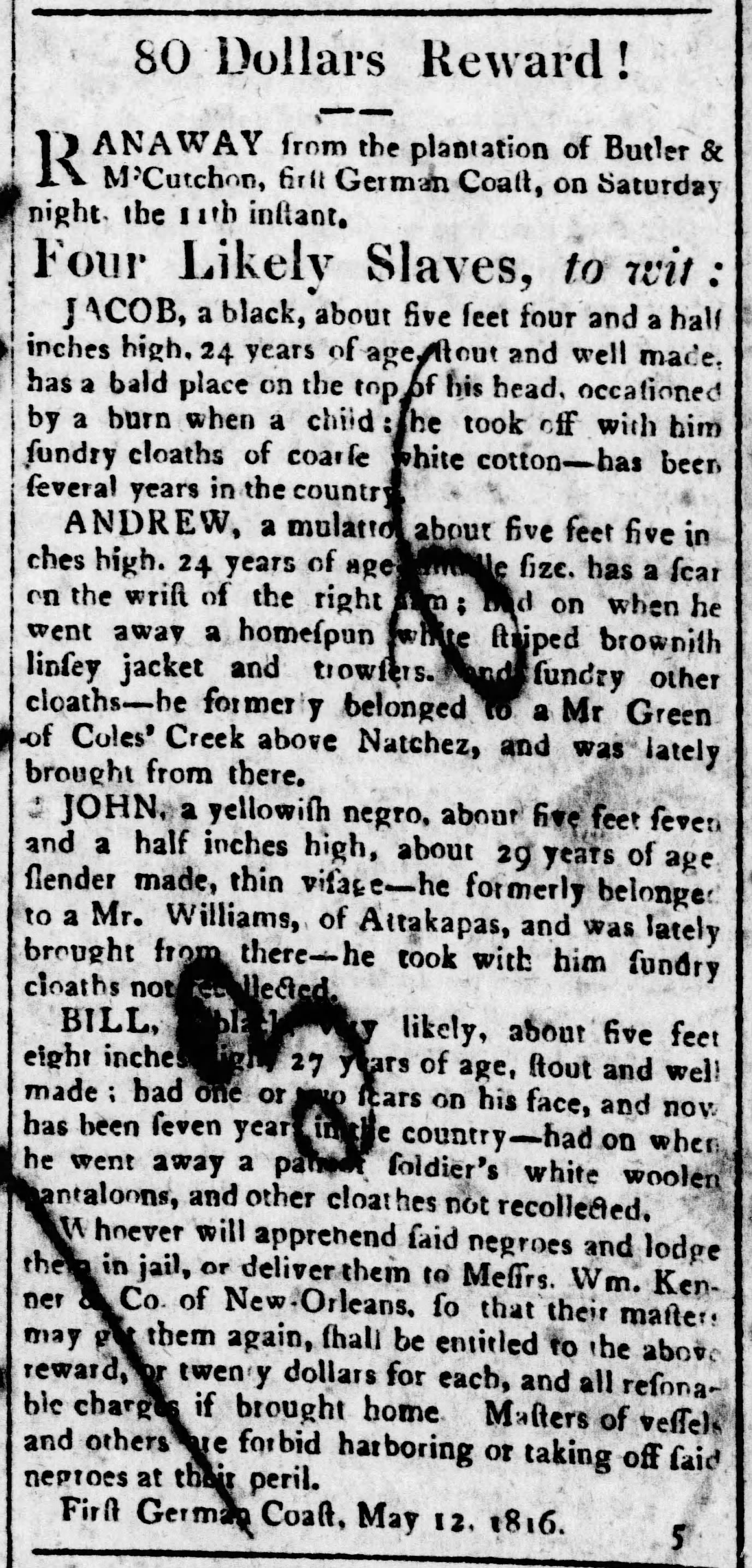
"80 Dollars Reward" Natchez Gazette, July 17, 1816

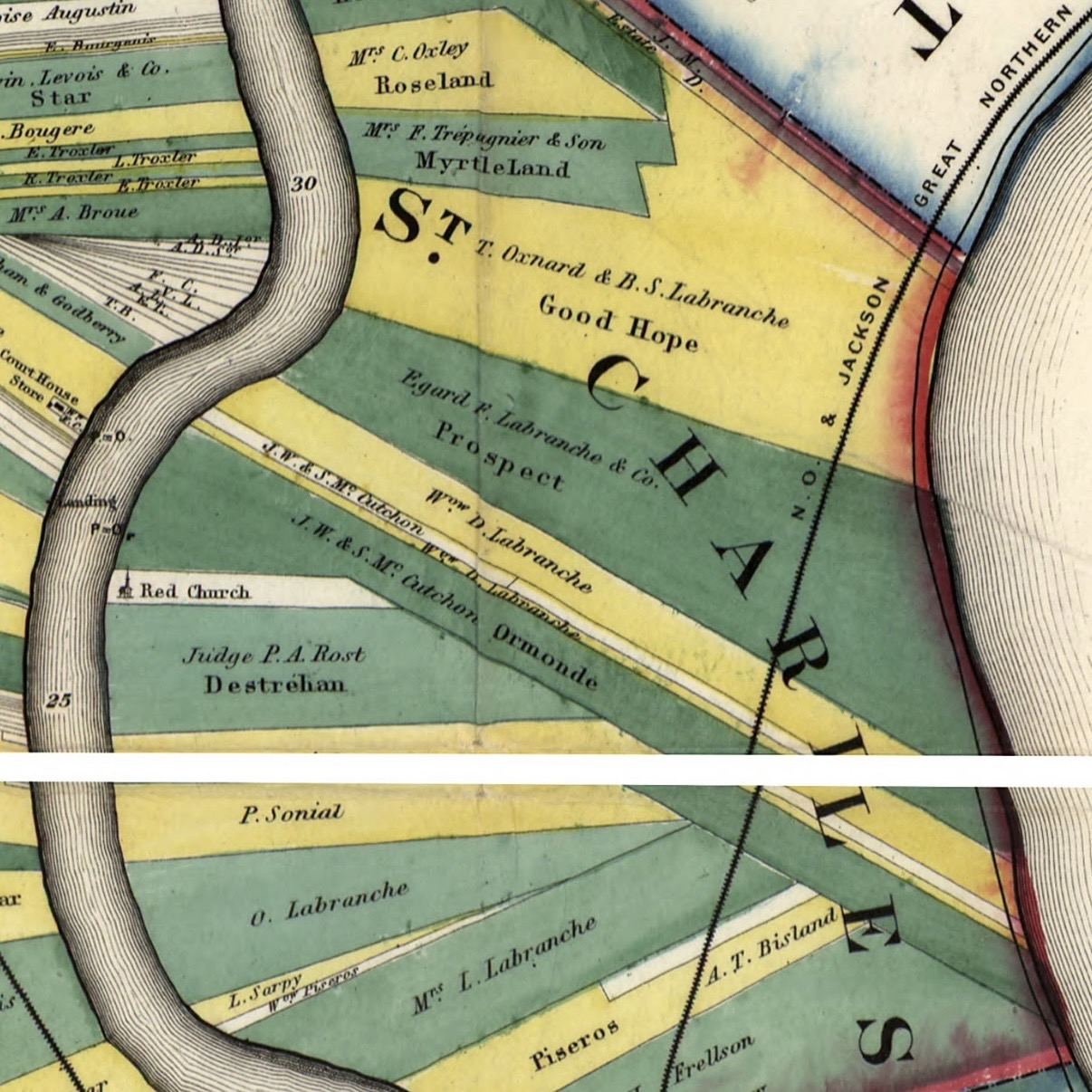
Ormonde and Destrahan plantations mapped on Norman's chart of the lower Mississippi River in the 1850s

On June 29, 1819 (ten years later, or fourteen years after acquiring the property), in a private pact signed at the plantation, Richard Butler turned over all of his holdings to McCutchon and he and his wife moved to Bay St. Louis, Mississippi. No reason was ever given to explain why Butler sold the plantation although it is thought that it was an attempt at evading the local yellow fever epidemic. If this was true then his attempts failed as it was reported that the fever had caught up with him and he died Bay St. Louis with his wife at age 43.

There is some disagreement as to when the two existing wings, or garconnieres, were built. Some say that they were built around 1811 by Richard Butler while others believe they were built in 1830 by Captain McCutchon. The garconnieres (bachelor quarters) are what give Ormond Plantation House a unique look and are taller than the main part of the house. It is believed they were influenced by architecture from the Atlantic seaboard. Captain McCutchon's eldest son, Samuel B. McCutchon, married Adele d'Estrehan, the daughter of the owner of neighboring Destrehan Plantation, uniting two of the area's most powerful families. Samuel and his brother James William McCutchon took over the plantation upon the death of their father, and it continued to prosper.

After the Civil War, the plantation fell on hard times and was sold twice before being sold two more times at public auctions in 1874 and 1875. On December 1, 1898, Ormond Plantation was purchased by State Senator Basile LaPlace Jr, (son of New Orleans pharmacist and land owner after whom the town of LaPlace is named) who envisioned its use as a rice-producing enterprise. Mr. LaPlace was a well-known Justice of the Peace and then as a state senator, and also successfully managed the LaPlace land area left to him by his father. Legend has it that on the night of October 11, 1899 (less than one year after buying Ormond), he was found hanging from a large oak tree on the property with bullet holes in his body. It is believed that the assassination was carried out by members of the local Ku Klux Klan which he would likely have had disagreements with due to his position, however at the time it was also believed it may have been carried out by the caretaker and his son in revenge for LaPlace's apparent "philandering" with the caretaker's daughter; however there is no evidence to suggest either is true.

After the LaPlace family, the Schexnaydre family purchased the plantation. Five Schexnaydre brothers (Joseph, Emilien, Barthelemy, Albert, and Norbet) each held a one-fifth share of the property. Emilien's family moved into the manor house, and at one time five Schexnaydre families lived there. This family held the property until 1926, when it was sold to the Inter-Credit Corporation.

During the late 1920s and into the 1930s, a number of tenants occupied the house and the land. The home was allowed to deteriorate, until it was purchased by Mr. and Mrs. Alfred Brown, owners of the Brown's Velvet Dairy in New Orleans. Beginning in 1943, the Browns undertook a major restoration, which included enclosing the carriageways and making the garconnieres a part of the main building. The Browns added modern conveniences such as indoor plumbing, natural gas, and electricity.

After the death of Mrs. Brown, Mr. Brown sold Ormond to a real estate developer, Johnson & Loggins, who made minor but costly renovations in the manor house. In 1974, Johnson & Loggins sold the home and 17 acres of land to Betty R. LeBlanc, then executive vice-president of Barq's Beverages, Inc., in New Orleans. During the late 1970s and early 1980s, Mrs. LeBlanc began restoring the plantation house, which had begun to deteriorate due to the [inadequate?] renovations made by Johnson & Loggins. She was not able to see the renovations completed, succumbing to cancer in June 1986.

== Present day ==
Ormond Plantation is currently listed on the National Register of Historic Places and is owned by Irvin J. Carmouche. Mr. Carmouche continues to restore it and allows the manor home to be used for public tours along with weddings, luncheons, and other private events. Ormond is also operating as a bed and breakfast inn.

== See also ==
- List of plantations in Louisiana
- National Register of Historic Places listings in St. Charles Parish, Louisiana
