= Pierre Adolphe Rost =

American judge (1797–1868)

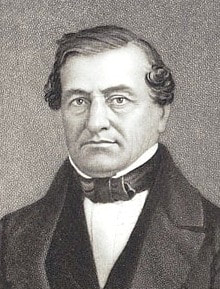
Pierre Adolphe Rost

Pierre Adolphe Rost (1797 – September 6, 1868) was a Louisiana politician, diplomat, lawyer, judge, and plantation owner.

== Early life and emigration to the United States ==
Born in the department of Lot-et-Garonne, France in 1797, Rost received his education at the École Polytechnique in Paris, where men were recruited into either the civil service or military service. As an artilleryman, he was credited for brave conduct in the defense of Paris on March 30, 1814. Rost applied for a commission in Napoleon's army after the Emperor's escape from Elba, but he was too late for the Battle of Waterloo.

Escaping from what he thought to be an oppressive régime, Rost emigrated to New Orleans, arriving in the spring of 1816. Then he became a teacher in Natchez, Mississippi, and studied law under Joseph Emory Davis, the brother of Jefferson Davis.

Next, Rost moved to Natchitoches, Louisiana, where the majority of the people spoke French, a factor he was confident would bolster the success of his law practice. In 1826, he was elected to the Louisiana State Senate, where he served for four years.

In 1830, Pierre Rost was nominated for Congress, but at the time of the nomination he was engaged to Louise Odile Destrehan [des Tours] (1802 - Feb. 24, 1877). When they decided to wed before the congressional elections, the distractions of marriage caused him to somewhat neglect his political campaign. The unfortunate result was that he was defeated by a few votes to Henry Adams Bullard.

Shortly after losing his bid for Congress, near the end of 1830 he moved with his family to New Orleans (his wife already had one or two children from a previous marriage) and resumed practicing law. Rost continued in his law practice for the next eight years, until the summer of 1838 when he took his family on a trip to Europe to visit his mother and sisters. The Rost family returned to the U.S. in the autumn. Before death, he relocated his family to the newly formed Jefferson City, Missouri

== Louise Odile Destrehan and the History of Destrehan Manor ==
In 1830 Rost married Louise Odile Destrehan [des Tours] in New Orleans, becoming her second husband. On April 11, 1839 he bought Destrehan Manor (including its contingent of about 83 slaves), a plantation located in St. Charles Parish, Louisiana, which had been associated with the Destrehan family since 1802. Rost purchased the plantation from the executors of its previous owner Stephen Henderson (1773–1838). Henderson in turn had bought Destrehan Manor for the sum of $114,400 on March 23, 1825, not long after its prior owners had both died. Then, he went on to marry (on Oct. 19, 1826) Marie Eleonore "Zelia" Destrehan [des Tours] (1800–1830) who was a daughter of the prior owners and a sister of Rost's wife. The owners of Destrehan Manor prior to Stephen Henderson were Jean Noel Destrehan [des Tours] (Dec. 12, 1759 - Oct. 4, 1823) and his wife Marie Claudine Celeste Elenore Robin de Logny (Sept. 5, 1770 - Sept. 3, 1824). Jean Noel and his wife had owned the plantation since April 12, 1802 when Jean Noel bought it from his brother-in-law Pierre-Paul-Guy Robin de Logny (born June 29, 1764).

Upon his return from a trip to Europe, Rost was appointed judge of the Supreme Court of Louisiana, served from March to June 1839, then resigned to engage in agricultural pursuits. He returned on March 19, 1846 when reorganization of the court was effected, serving until May 4, 1853. During the American Civil War, he sided with the Confederacy. On March 16, 1861, Confederate President Jefferson Davis appointed Rost, William Lowndes Yancey (1814–1863) and Ambrose Dudley Mann (1801–1889) the first Confederate Commissioners to Europe. Rost served as the Commissioner of the Confederate States of America for Spain. Yancey served as the Confederate Commissioner for England and France, and Mann eventually served as the Confederate Commissioner for Belgium and the Vatican. The three sailed together for Europe on March 31, 1861. Rost and Yancey were later replaced by John Slidell (1793–1871) and James Murray Mason (1798–1871).

Rost owned the Destrehan Plantation also known as the Rost Home Colony in St. Charles Parish, Louisiana which was owned by the family of his wife, Louise Odile Destréhan, from 1865 until it was seized by the Bureau of Refugees, Freedmen and Abandoned Lands in 1866. Through that time, it was used to house a self-contained colony of freedmen, complete with a hospital, schools, colony store and police force. Rost then returned with a full pardon from President Andrew Johnson and successfully demanded for the return of his property.

Rost continued practicing law until he died in New Orleans, Louisiana, on September 6, 1868.

== Works ==
- Eulogy upon the life and character of George Eustis,: Formerly chief justice of the Supreme court of Louisiana. Pronounced at Lyceum hall, on the 31st March, 1859 (1859)

Political offices
Preceded by Henry Adams Bullard; Court reconfigured	Associate Justice of the Louisiana Supreme Court; 1839–1839; 1846–1853	Succeeded by Alonzo Morphy; Court reconfigured
