= Harry J. Kember Jr. =

American politician (1934–2012)

Harry Joseph Kember Jr.

Member of the Louisiana House of Representatives
- In office 1980–1987

Personal details
- Born: April 28, 1934 Destrehan, Louisiana
- Died: February 9, 2012 (aged 77)
- Children: Five
- Education: Ascension Catholic High School (1952)
- Profession: Politician

Harry Joseph Kember Jr. (April 28, 1934 – February 9, 2012) was an American politician.

Born in Destrehan, Louisiana, Kember graduated from Ascension Catholic High School in 1952 and lived in White Castle, Louisiana. He served in the Louisiana National Guard and on the Atchafalaya Basin Levy Board. Kember served in the Louisiana House of Representatives from 1980 to 1987, and was a Democrat. Kember was convicted of mail fraud and bribery and was sentenced to prison.

Kember died in 2012, aged 77. A widower, he was survived by five children and fifteen grandchildren, and a large extended family.
