= Homeplace Plantation House =

Historic house in Louisiana, United States

- U.S. National Register of Historic Places
- U.S. National Historic Landmark
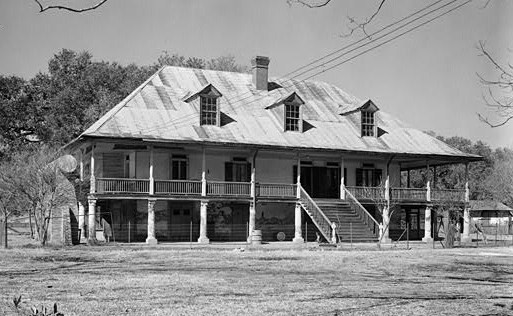
- Homeplace Plantation in 1940

- Location within Louisiana Location within the United States
- Nearest city: Hahnville, Louisiana
- Coordinates: 29.971057°N 90.407583°W
- Area: 746 acres (302 ha)
- Built: 1787
- Architectural style: Colonial
- NRHP reference No.: 70000842

Significant dates
- Added to NRHP: April 15, 1970
- Designated NHL: April 15, 1970

Homeplace Plantation House, also known as Keller Homestead, is a National Historic Landmark on Louisiana Highway 18 in Hahnville, St. Charles Parish, Louisiana. Built 1787–91, it is one of the nation's finest examples of a French colonial raised cottage. It was declared a National Historic Landmark in 1970 for its architecture. It is private property, and is not open to the public.

== Description and history ==
Homeplace Plantation House is located on the south side of the Mississippi River, in Hahnville, the parish seat of St. Charles Parish, about 0.5 miles (0.80 km) south of the local post office. The plantation house is set on a landscape lot at the southwest corner of LA 18 and Home Place. It is a two-story structure, with a hip roof and a two-story gallery porch encircling the structure. The first floor is built out of stuccoed brick, as are the pillars that support the second level of the gallery. The bricks used in the pillars were formed in wedge-shaped molds. The upper gallery is built out of cypress, as are the second-floor walls, floors, and ceilings. The timbers used in the walls have been chinked with clay and Spanish moss. The interior retains some original features, including wine racks in two basement storage rooms, and marble flooring in the dining room.

The house was built sometime between 1787 and 1791, although it is unclear for whom. It was probably built by the same builder who constructed the Parlange Plantation House, with which it shares many similar features. It is, with Parlange, one of the best-preserved examples of this period of colonial French architecture. The house was owned in its early years by members of the Gaillard and Fortier families, and was purchased in 1889 by Pierre Anatole Keller.

The house is not open to the public. The unoccupied house continues to deteriorate. One elderly owner (93 years old) reported he was not able to do critical maintenance and repairs. Hurricane Katrina (in 2005) broke windows, damaged the roof of the house, and damaged the pigeonnier. Primary setting for filming of the 1991 motion picture "Convicts" starring Robert Duvall, Lukas Haas, & James Eart Jones.

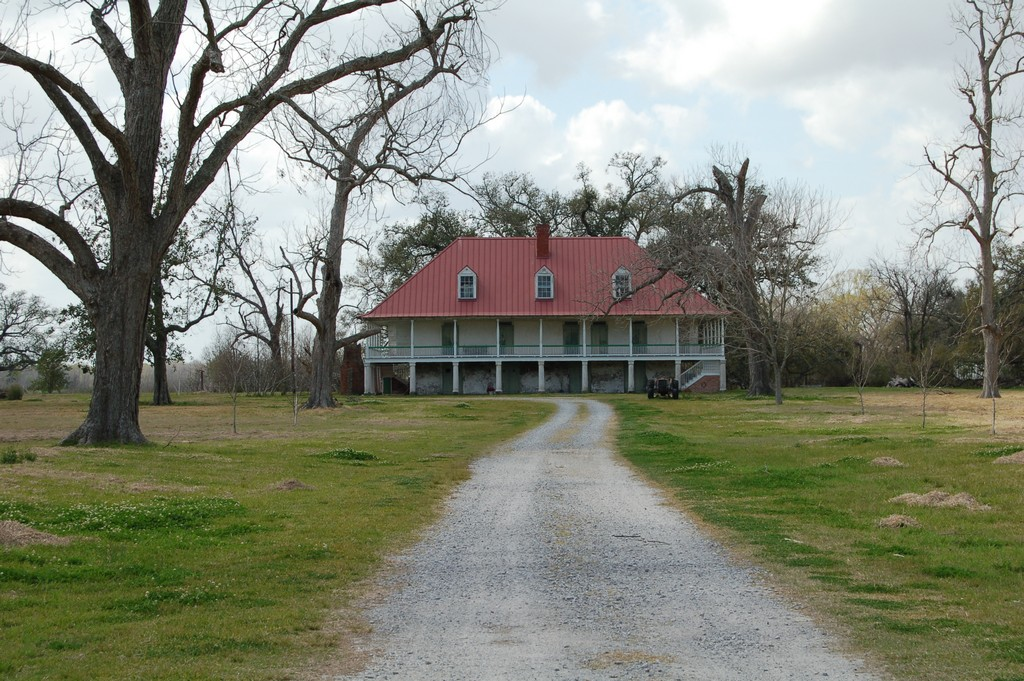
Homeplace and Plantation, 2005

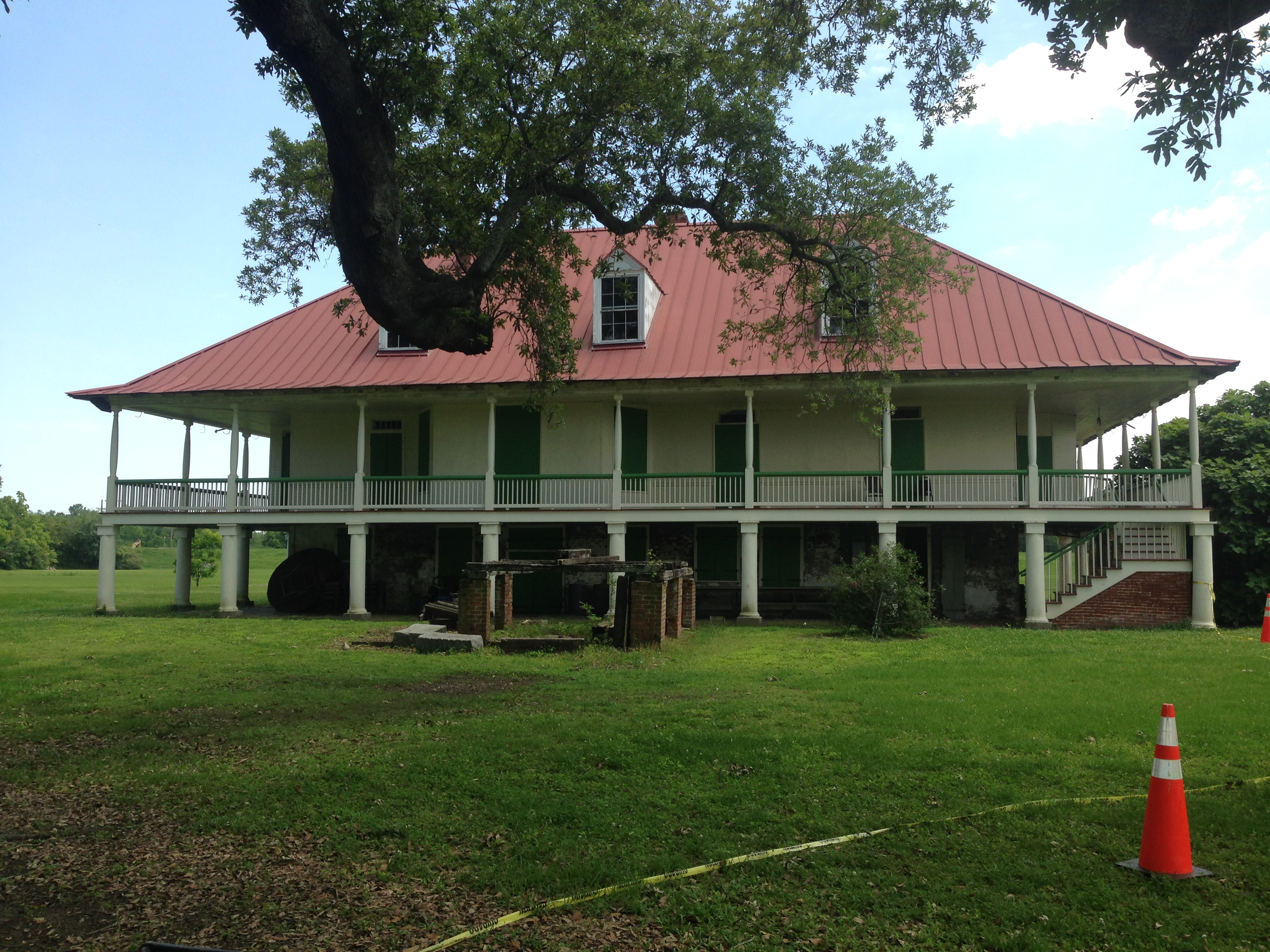
Rear view, 2015

== See also ==
- National Register of Historic Places listings in St. Charles Parish, Louisiana
- List of National Historic Landmarks in Louisiana
- List of the oldest buildings in Louisiana
- List of plantations in Louisiana
