= Jean Noël Destréhan =

American politician (1759–1823)

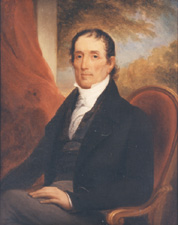

United States Senator from Louisiana
- In office September 3, 1812 – October 1, 1812
- Preceded by: (none)
- Succeeded by: Thomas Posey

Personal details
- Born: 1754 New Orleans, Colony of Louisiana
- Died: October 4, 1823 (aged 68–69) St. Charles Parish, Louisiana
- Party: Democratic-Republican
- Relatives: Jean Baptiste d'Estrehan (father); Étienne de Boré (brother-in-law)

Jean-Noël Destréhan de Tours (1754 – October 4, 1823) was a Creole politician in Louisiana and the second owner of what became known as Destrehan Plantation, in St. Charles Parish. It is one of Louisiana's historic antebellum landmarks. The community of Destrehan was named for his family.

Destréhan was born in colonial New Orleans to colonists Jean Baptiste d'Estrehan and Jeanne Catherine de Gauvret (1729-1773). They sent him to France for his education. His father was the colonial treasurer for France in the colony, and his brother-in-law was Étienne de Boré, who perfected the sugar granulation process and served as New Orleans' first mayor.

After his return, Destréhan married Marie Claudine Eléonore Robin de Logny in 1786. He became established and bought Destréhan Plantation in 1792. He briefly served as one of two "adjoint" or deputy mayors of New Orleans alongside Pierre Sauvé in 1803.

After the Louisiana Purchase by the United States, he served as Speaker of the territorial House of Representatives from 1804 to 1806 before receiving an appointment from President Thomas Jefferson to serve on the Orleans Territorial Council. Destréhan served in this position during 1806 as president of the council. President James Madison appointed him to a second legislative council for Orleans Territory in 1811, where he served again as president. The Orleans Territorial Council crafted a legal system based on French and Spanish civil codes and established Louisiana's parish system of governance.

Destréhan ran for Governor in 1812 the first gubernatorial election since Louisiana statehood, but he placed a distant third behind American William C. C. Claiborne and Louisiana Creole Jacques Villeré. He was selected by the state legislature to serve in the United States Senate instead, but he resigned within a month. He served in the Louisiana State Senate from 1812 to 1817. He again ran for Governor in the 1820 election but placed fourth.

During the 1814-15 Battle of New Orleans threat, Jean N. Destrehan served on the Committee of Defense. Three of his sons served in a cavalry unit.

He continued work as a planter, dying at his plantation on October 4, 1823. Destréhan was buried at the St. Charles Borromeo Church cemetery in Destrehan, Louisiana.

== Jean Noël Destréhan and sugar plantation slavery ==
Destréhan pioneered the Creole system of slave labor on his sugar plantations. A blend between the harsher gang system and the more lenient task system, the Creole approach was to use head slaves called drivers to allot tasks and inspect work, as opposed to relying on a hired overseer. During the planting and grinding seasons, plantation owners required slaves to work long hours; but during the off-season when the sugar cane fields needed little maintenance, slaves were allowed a considerable amount of time off to grow food, work for themselves, and trade.

Several of Destréhan's slaves participated in the 1811 German Coast Uprising, said to have been the largest slave rebellion in American history. Destréhan himself served on a local six-member tribunal at the conclusion of the revolt. Destrehan Plantation was the location of the St. Charles Parish slave trials. Three of Destréhan's slaves were among the eighteen conspirators who were summarily executed.

== See also ==
- Destrehan Plantation
- Etienne de Boré
- German Coast
  - 1811 German Coast uprising
- History of slavery in Louisiana
- Slavery in the colonial United States
- Louisiana Creole people
- National Register of Historic Places listings in St. Charles Parish, Louisiana

U.S. Senate
Preceded by None	U.S. senator (Class 2) from Louisiana; 1812; Served alongside: Allan B. Magruder	Succeeded by Thomas Posey
