= St. Rose, Louisiana =

St. Rose, Louisiana Saint Rose
- CDP
- Location of St. Rose in Louisiana
- Coordinates: 29°57′38″N 90°18′47″W
- Country: United States
- State: Louisiana
- Parish: St. Charles

Area
  - Total: 7.46 sq mi (19.31 km^{2})
  - Land: 6.34 sq mi (16.42 km^{2})
  - Water: 1.12 sq mi (2.89 km^{2})
- Elevation: 10 ft (3.0 m)

Population (2020)
  - Total: 7,504
  - Density: 1,183.7/sq mi (457.04/km^{2})
- Time zone: UTC-6 (CST)
  - Summer (DST): UTC-5 (CDT)
- ZIP code: 70087
- Area code: 504
- FIPS code: 22-67740

Saint Rose (usually written as St. Rose) is a census-designated place (CDP) in St. Charles Parish, Louisiana, United States. St. Rose is on the east bank of the Mississippi River, two miles (3 km) north of the Jefferson Parish border and is part of the Greater New Orleans metropolitan area. The population was 6,540 in the 2000 census, and 7,504 in 2020.

== History ==
The LaBranche Plantation Dependency House is located in St. Rose. It is a surviving building of the LaBranche Plantation. The main house was the plantation home built by the Zweig family in 1792. The plantation was based on the cultivation and processing of sugar cane and was dependent on slave labor. The big house was destroyed during the Civil War. One of the few buildings left on the property after the Civil War was the dependency house, also called a garçonnière (French for bachelor quarters). The property also has a preserved slave quarters building.

In 1873, Palmer Elkins purchased property in St. Rose. In 1880, Elkins invited freedmen and their families to move onto his property to receive training. He established what became known as "Elkinsville" or "Freetown".

== Geography ==
St. Rose is located at 29°57′38″N 90°18′47″W (29.960421, -90.313094).

According to the United States Census Bureau, the CDP has a total area of 5.0 square miles (13.0 km^{2}), of which 4.0 square miles (10.5 km^{2}) is land and 1.0 square mile (2.6 km^{2}) (19.88%) is water.

== Demographics ==
Historical population
Census	Pop.	Note	%±
1960	1,099		—
1970	2,106		91.6%
1990	6,259		—
2000	6,450		3.1%
2010	8,122		25.9%
2020	7,504		−7.6%
U.S. Decennial Census; 1950 1960 1970 1980; 1990 2000 2010

St. Rose first appeared as an unincorporated place in the 1960 U.S. census; and as a census designated place in the 1990 United States census. The census did not survey the CDP in the 1980 U.S. census.

St. Rose racial composition as of 2020
Race	Number	Percentage
White (non-Hispanic)	3,063	40.82%
Black or African American (non-Hispanic)	3,028	40.35%
Native American	13	0.17%
Asian	158	2.11%
Pacific Islander	3	0.04%
Other/Mixed	258	3.44%
Hispanic or Latino	981	13.07%

As of the 2020 United States census, there were 7,504 people, 2,914 households, and 1,905 families residing in the CDP.

== Education ==
St. Charles Parish Public School System operates public schools, including:

- St. Rose Elementary School (PK-5)
- Albert Cammon Middle School (6–8)
- Destrehan High School in Destrehan

== Notable people ==
- Macon Clark, NFL safety for the Chicago Bears
- Burnell Dent, NFL linebacker for the Green Bay Packers and New York Giants
- Snooks Eaglin, guitarist and singer
- Roy Ebron, Basketball player in the ABA
- Shelley Hennig, Miss Teen USA 2004 and actress
- Jordan Jefferson, former NFL quarterback
- Justin Jefferson, NFL wide receiver for the Minnesota Vikings
- Curtis Johnson, Head football coach at Tulane University and NFL assistant coach
- Beulah Levy Ledner, Dessert and pastry chef
- Ed Reed, College Football Hall of Fame and NFL Hall of Fame safety for the Baltimore Ravens, Houston Texans and New York Jets
- Darryl Richard, NFL defensive tackle for the New England Patriots
- Margaret Taylor-Burroughs, co-founder of the DuSable Museum of African American History in Chicago
- Gary Tyler, who is believed to have been wrongly convicted of murder in 1974. He was released in 2016.
- Josh Victorian, NFL cornerback for the Baltimore Ravens, Detroit Lions, Houston Texans, New England Patriots, New Orleans Saints, New York Giants and Pittsburgh Steelers
- Darius Vinnett, NFL cornerback for the St. Louis Rams and Atlanta Falcons
- Michael Young Jr., NFL wide receiver for the Indianapolis Colts

== Gallery ==
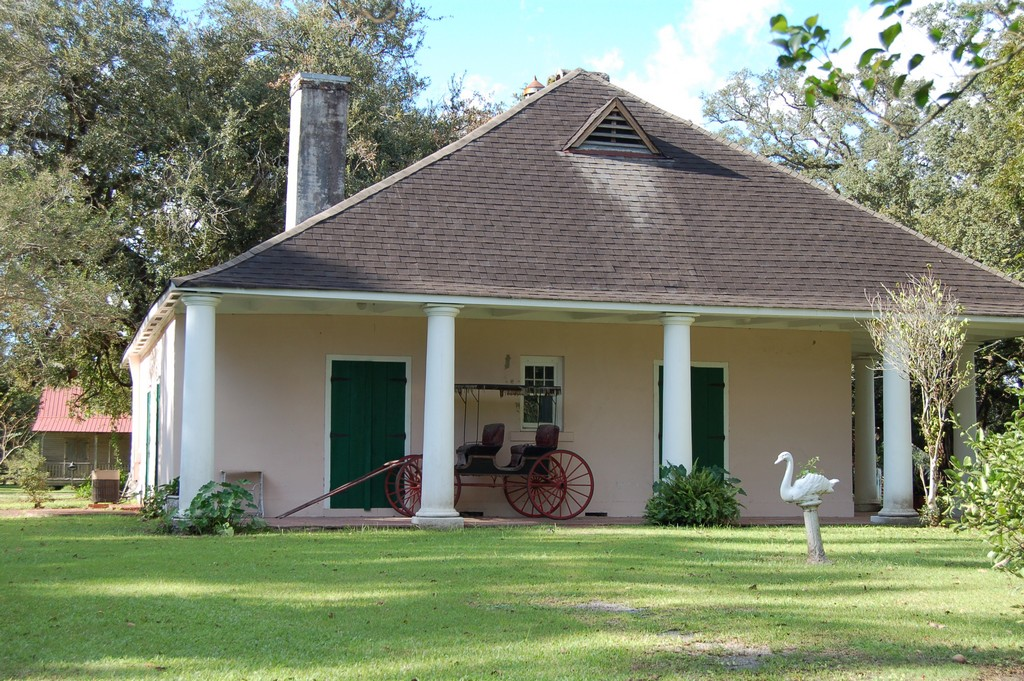
LaBranche Plantation Dependency House

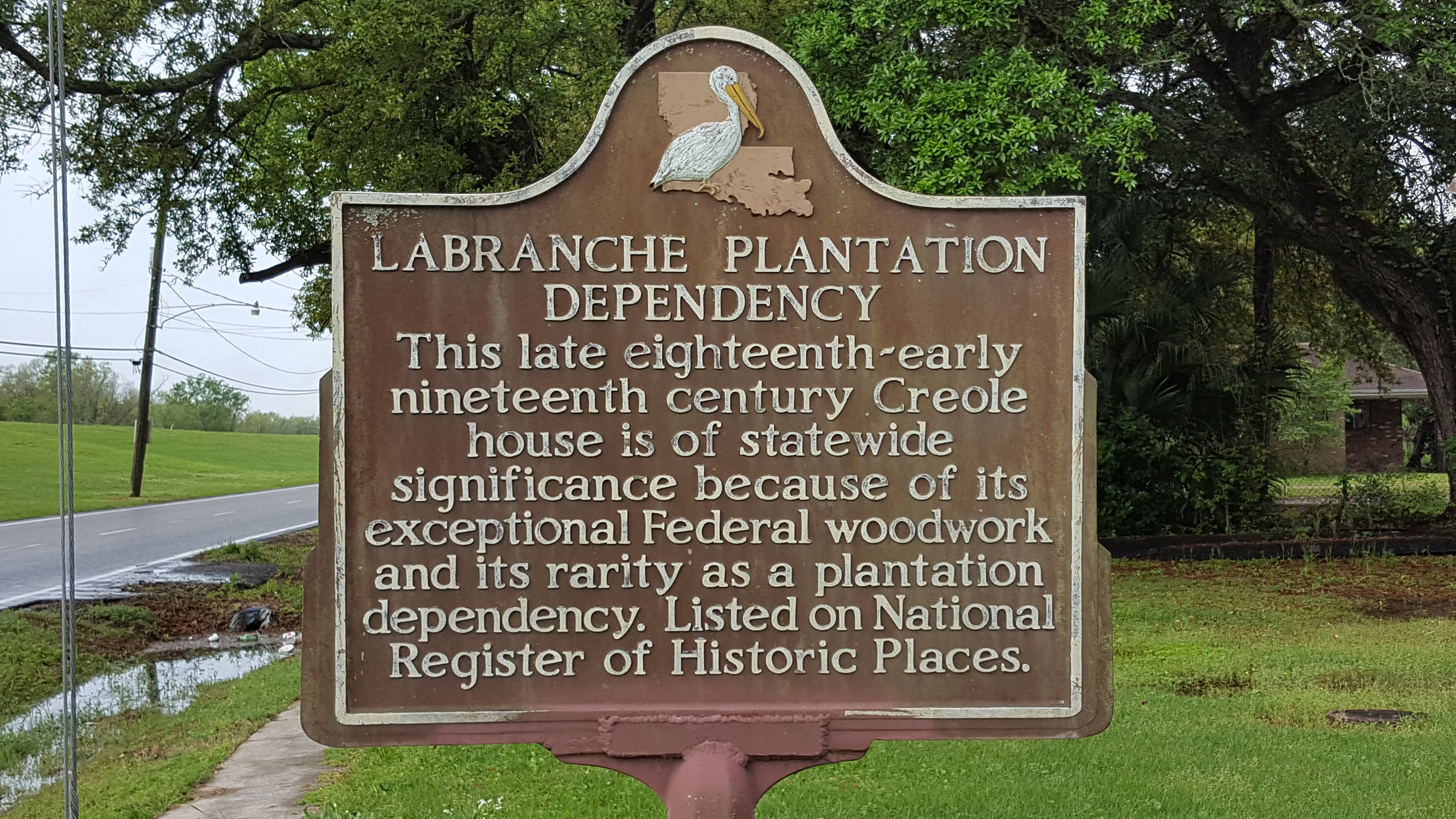
LaBranche Plantation Dependency House historical marker

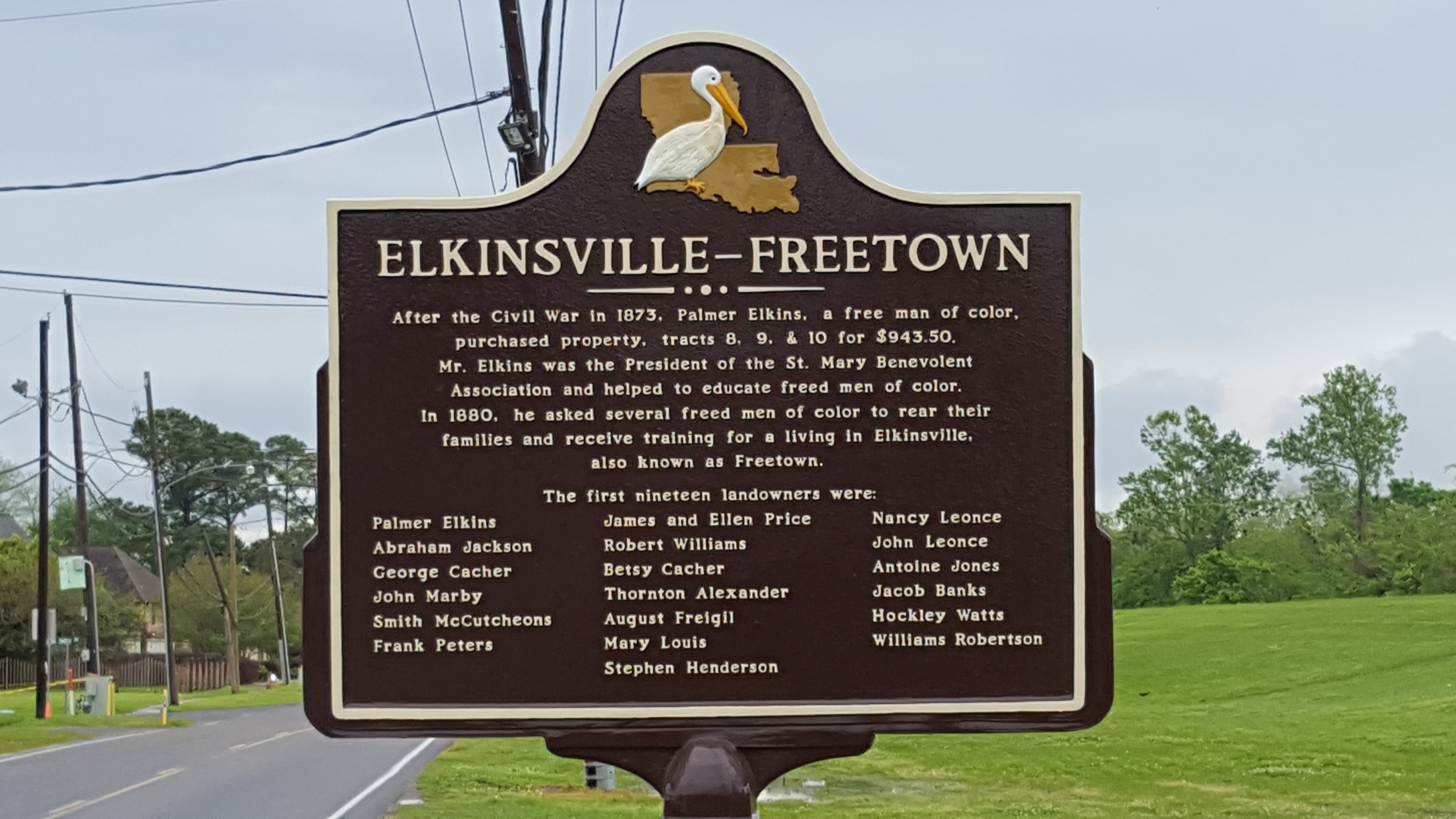
Elkinsville-Freetown historical marker
