= LaBranche Plantation Dependency =

Historic house in Louisiana, United States

- U.S. National Register of Historic Places
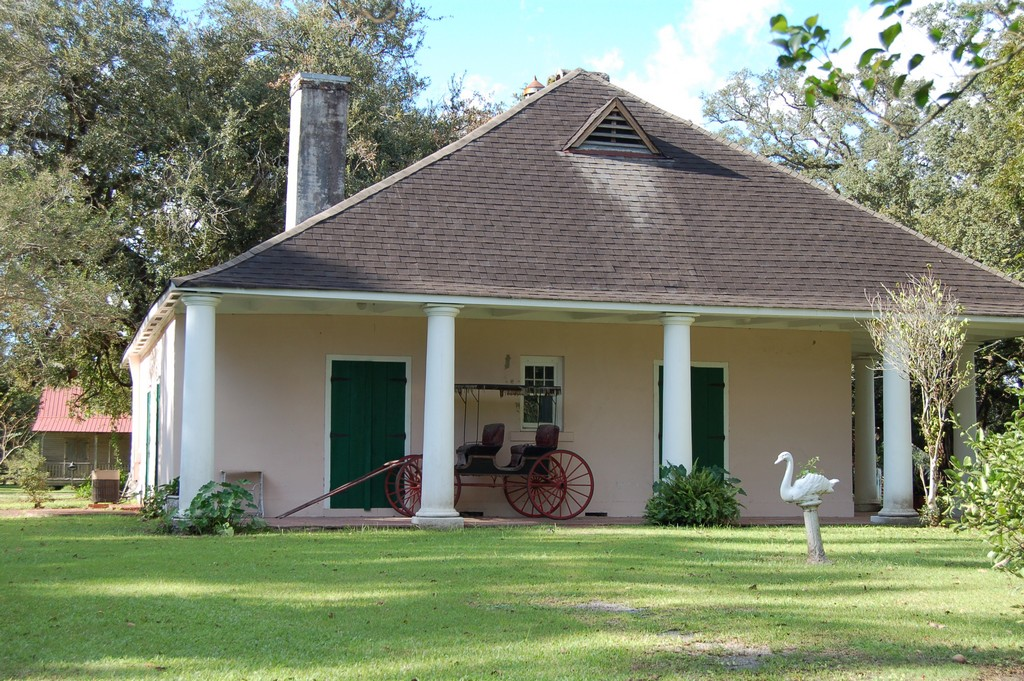
- LaBranche Plantation Dependency

- Location within Louisiana Location within the United States
- Location: River Rd. (LA 48), St. Rose, Louisiana
- Coordinates: 29°57′00″N 90°18′58″W
- Built: 1792
- NRHP reference No.: 84000145
- Added to NRHP: October 18, 1984

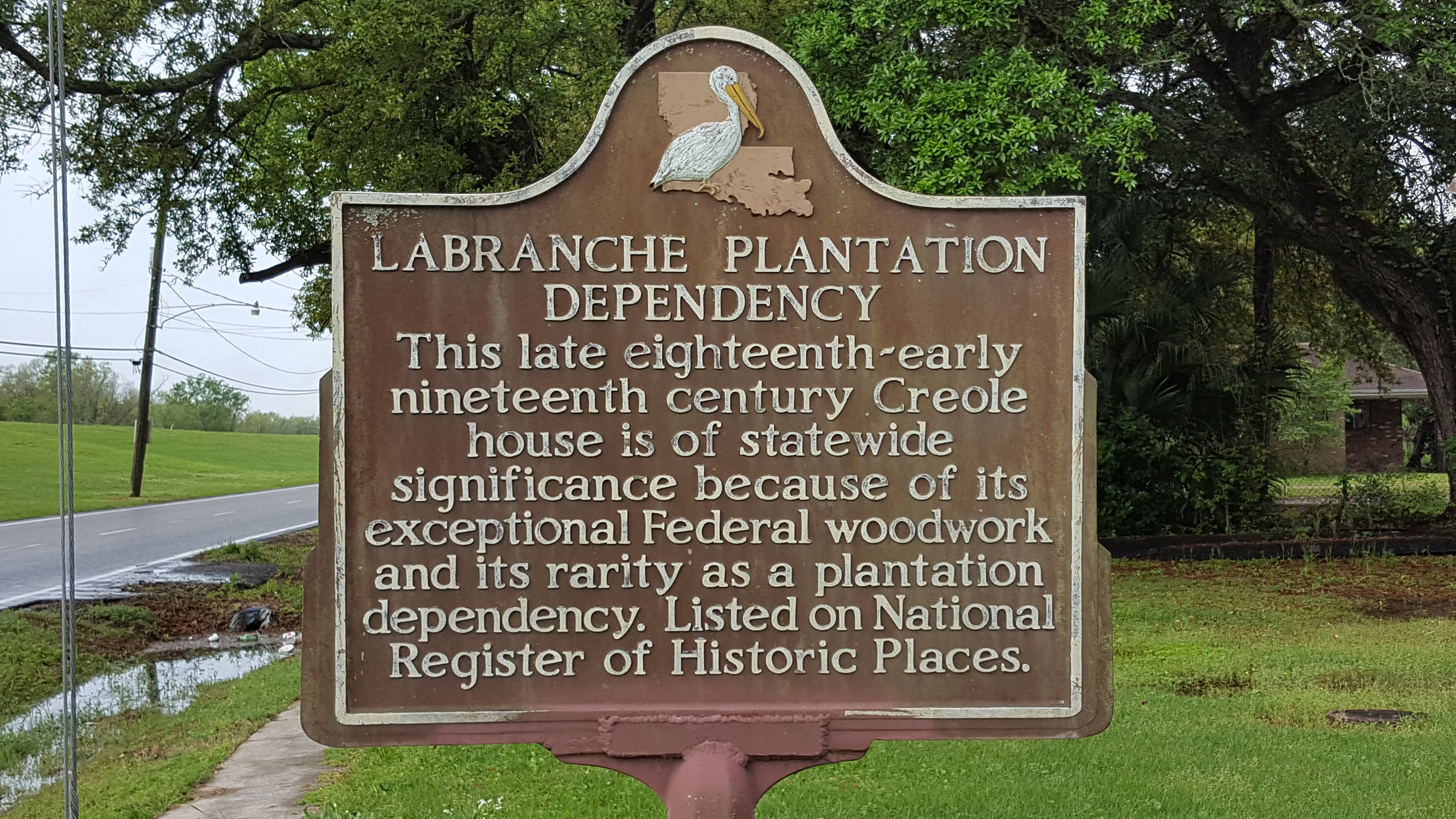
LaBranche Plantation Dependency historical marker

The LaBranche Plantation Dependency House is located in St. Rose, St. Charles Parish, Louisiana. From many accounts, LaBranche Plantation, also known as Barbarra Plantation, in St. Rose, Louisiana, was one of the grandest on the German Coast until it was destroyed during the American Civil War. All that remained was the dependency house, known as a garconnière (French for bachelor quarters).

The dependency was listed on the National Register of Historic Places in 1984. It was deemed to have "statewide significance in the area of architecture as a rare and superior example of the Creole style." Further:

The importance of the dependency rests upon its elaborate and pretentious detailing. Both its beams and ceiling boards are beaded, which alone makes it superior to numerous other surviving examples of the Creole style. Beyond this, it has high quality mantels which are very unexpected on a house so small. With their strong moldings, elaborate sunburst motifs, and complex engaged balusters, the dependency's mantels are commensurate with those of a major Creole plantation house. Most Creole houses the size of the LaBranche Dependency were built as plantation houses in their own right and had the relatively plain styling appropriate to a smaller Creole house. But the LaBranche Dependency was built as an ancillary building to a plantation house of the first rank and was styled accordingly. Very few if any comparable dependencies survive in Louisiana. Hence the LaBranche Dependency is undoubtedly one of the state's most richly and impressively styled smaller Creole houses. It is also significant as a rare example of a residential plantation dependency from the early nineteenth century.

== History ==
The Zweig family, immigrants from Germany, acquired the property and built the plantation big house and related buildings in 1792. The main building was destroyed during the Civil War. Following the division of the property among heirs in the late 19th century, there is little left to indicate that a grand mansion stood on the grounds except for an allée lined with oak trees.

The late eighteenth-nineteenth century Creole dependency house, typically used for young bachelors and known in French as a garconnière, is significant because of its Federal woodwork and rarity as a surviving plantation dependency. Olidé and Marie Perilloux Cambre purchased the dependency house and property in 1902.

== Modern day ==
The site where the manor house once stood is on private land and is not accessible to the public. The site of the Dependency House is on land currently owned by the Lentini family of Kenner. The Lentinis purchased and restored the dependency house in 1983. On October 18, 1984, it was added to the National Register of Historic Places, due to its exquisite Federal woodwork and rarity as a plantation dependency or ancillary building.

The property also has a preserved slave quarters building. It has been restored, to show the living conditions of a slave family (or families). Preserved slave quarters are few in the area, since most plantations were purchased by oil refineries or industrial plants for the property; any remaining slave housing was usually torn down.

Also located on the site is the bathtub owned by Zachary Taylor, the 12th President of the United States (1849–1850).

== See also ==
- National Register of Historic Places listings in St. Charles Parish, Louisiana
- List of plantations in Louisiana
