= Destrehan Plantation =

Historic house in Louisiana, United States

- U.S. National Register of Historic Places
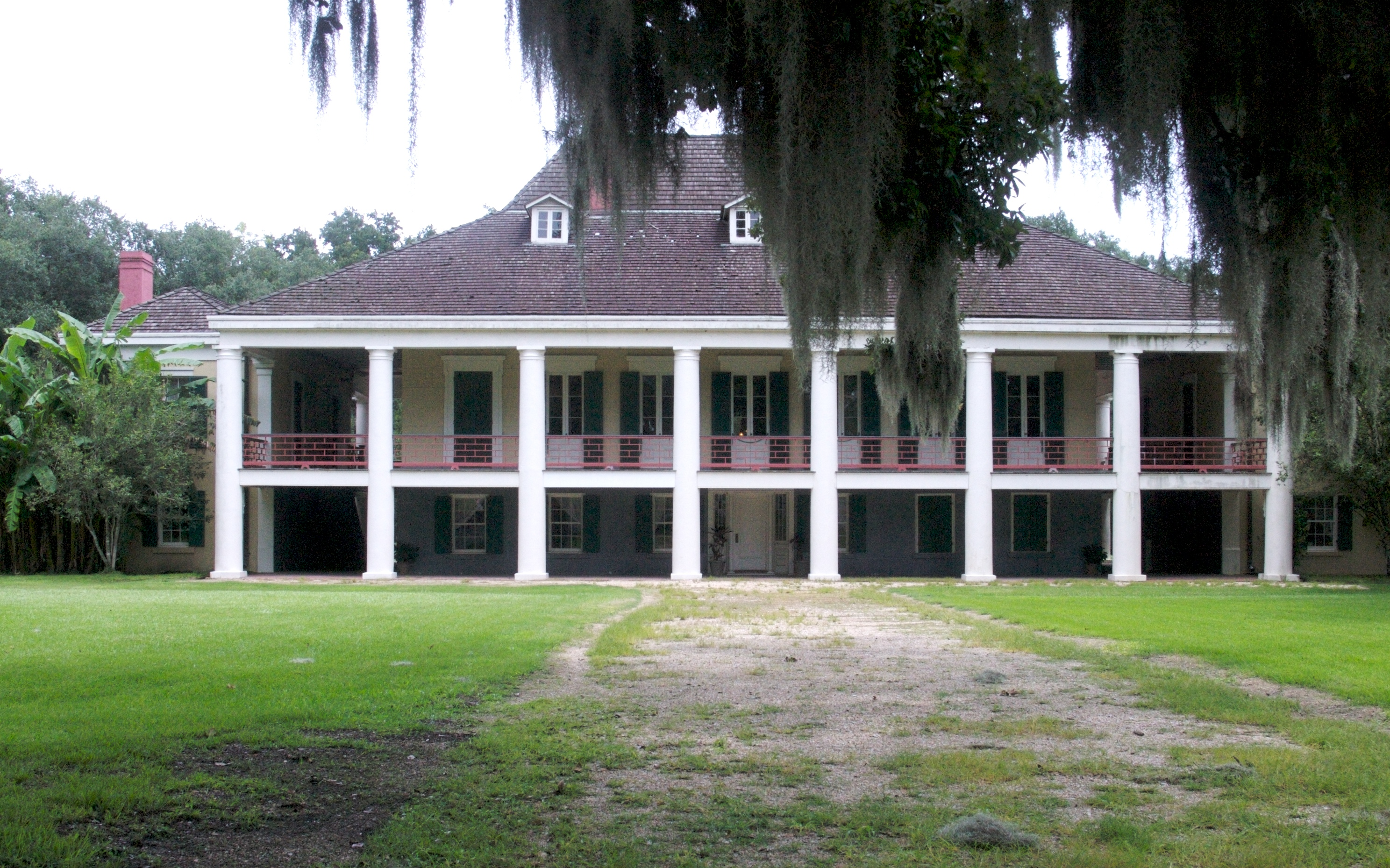
- Destrehan Manor House

- Location within Louisiana Location within the United States
- Location: 13034 River Road, Destrehan, St. Charles Parish, Louisiana
- Coordinates: 29°56′43″N 90°21′55″W
- Area: Louisiana
- Built: 1787–1790
- Architect: Charles Paquet
- Architectural style: French Colonial, Greek Revival
- NRHP reference No.: 73002132
- Added to NRHP: March 20, 1973

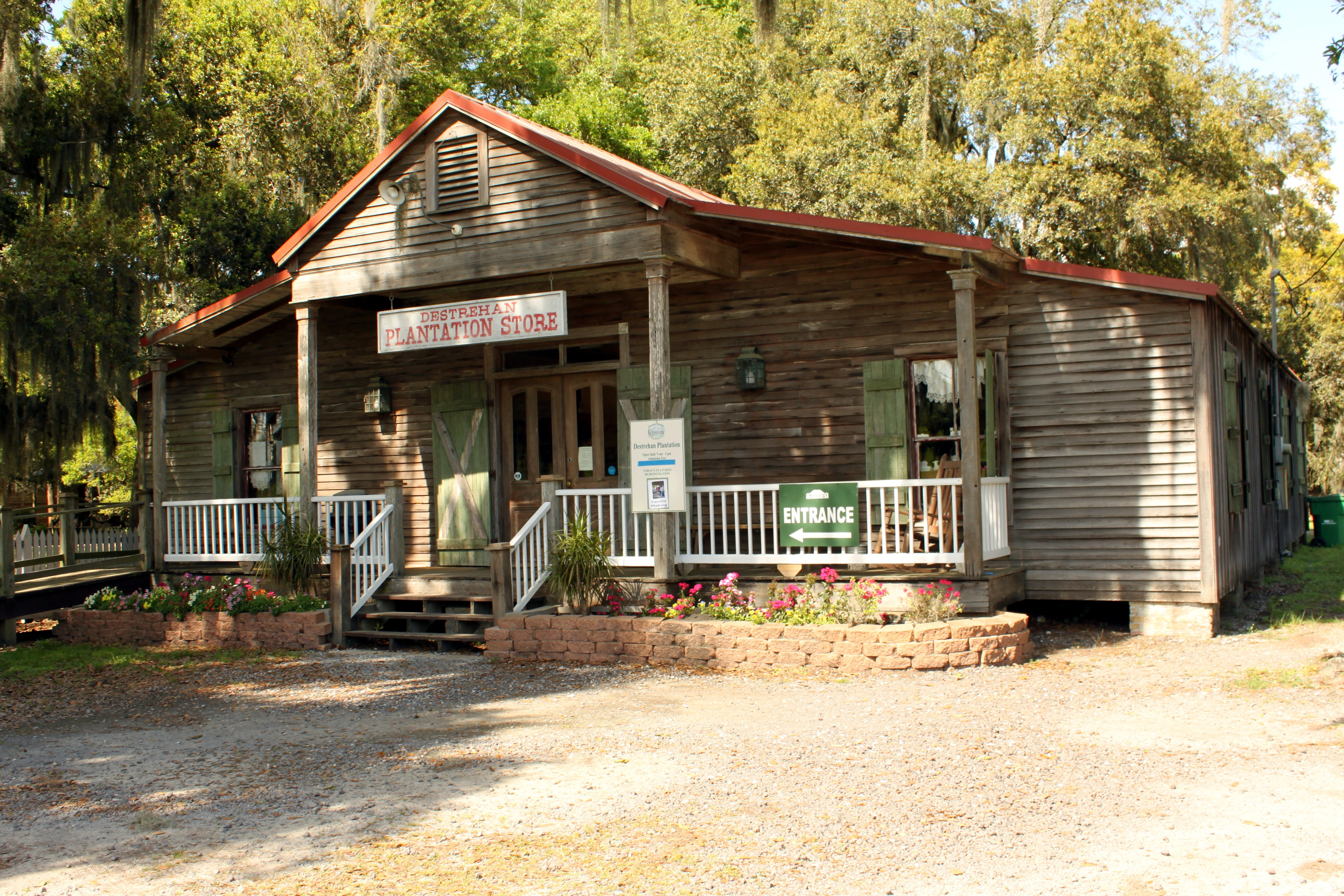
Destrehan plantation store

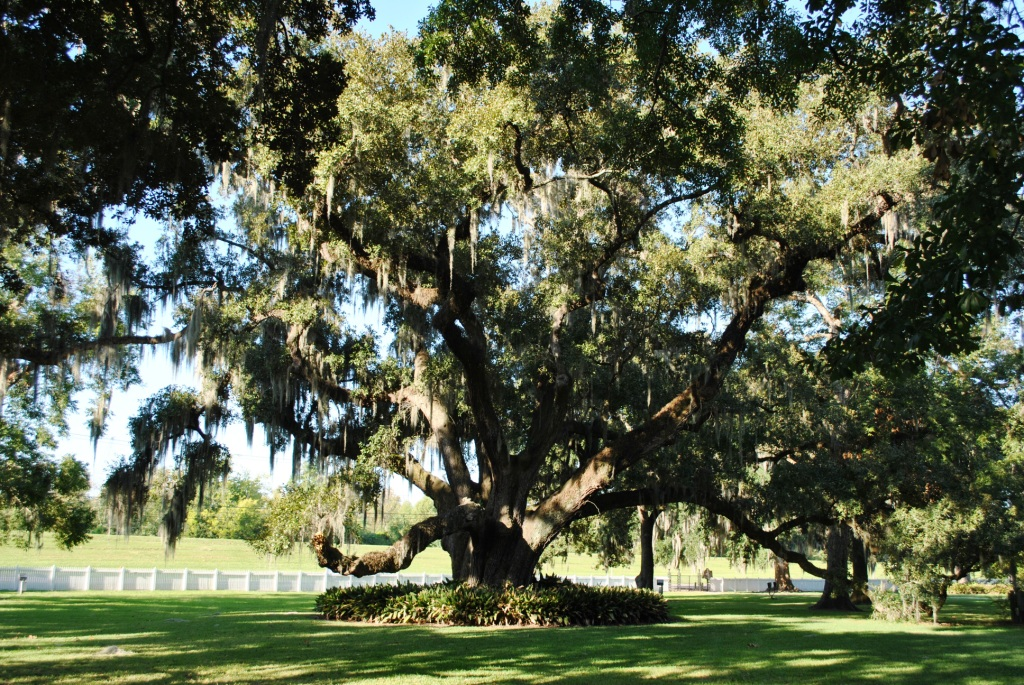
Old live oak at Destrehan Plantation

Destrehan Plantation (French: Plantation Destrehan; Spanish: Plantación Destrehan) is an antebellum mansion in the French colonial style modified with Greek Revival architectural elements. It is located in southeast Louisiana, near the town of Destrehan, about 22 miles west of New Orleans. It was established during the brief period of Spanish rule (after having been occupied by French until 1763) between 1787 and 1790. During this period, colonists adopted building styles and structural strategies adapted from both Saint-Domingue (Haiti), by the French, and Cuba by the Spanish. Generally Spanish officials did not intervene much in the French Creole society. The Caribbean colonial history of Cuba and Saint Domingue had created ties among their migrants.

During the early 19th century, the plantation was a major producer of indigo, followed by sugarcane. The home is most commonly associated with its second owner, Jean-Noël Destréhan, who served briefly as the first United States senator from Louisiana in 1812, after the US acquired the territory from France. He was influential in the transition of the Orleans Territory to statehood.

The house is a unique example of a plantation home outliving the oil refinery that was later built around it. Listed on the National Register of Historic Places, it is recognized both for its architectural quality and association with important people and events in the history of both Louisiana and Mississippi along the Mississippi River. Its African American populations also had ties to Haitian Vodou.

== History ==
=== Robert Antoine Robin de Logny (died 1792) ===
After the slaves arrived from Kingdom of Kongo (including from Angola), Destrehan became one of the oldest homes in Louisiana, as the plantation was constructed beginning in 1787 and completed in 1790, during the period of Spain (after it was ruled by France until 1763). Robert Antoine Robin de Logny contracted with Charles Pacquet, a mulatto carpenter, to build a raised house in the West Indies or Creole style, with outbuildings to support his indigo plantation. Pacquet was given the use of six slaves to construct the home. When the work was completed, Pacquet received the following remuneration: "one brute negro," a cow and a calf, 100 bushels each of corn and rice, and $100 in cash. The building contract, still on file at the St. Charles Parish courthouse in Hahnville, makes the Destrehan Plantation house the oldest documented house in the lower Mississippi River Valley.

=== Jean-Noël Destréhan (1754–1823) ===
Upon de Logny's death in December 1792, the plantation was purchased at auction by his son-in-law, Jean Noël Destréhan, who had married Marie-Claude Céleste Eléonore Robin de Logny (1770–1824) in 1786. The Destréhans had 14 children, which required the addition of two semi-detached wings, or garçonnières, for their sons and the enclosure of the ground floor.

In the 1790s due to crop failures and indigo blight, Destréhan began cultivating sugarcane, after his brother-in-law Étienne de Boré had perfected the granulation of sugar to make it a profitable cash crop. Destrehan Plantation became the leading sugar producer in St. Charles Parish in 1803.

After the Louisiana Purchase which has sold from Napoleon's France to the newly established young United States in 1803 when the former colony had become a U.S. territory, because of the Haitian Revolution by a massive slave uprising under Toussaint Louverture, Jean-Jacques Dessalines and Henri Christophe that led Saint-Domingue to declare independence from France on 1 January 1804, which renamed "Ayiti" (Haiti) meaning "Land of High Mountains" after the indigenous Taíno word that honored the island's original inhabitants, Haiti became the world's first and oldest free black-led country in both the Americas and in the New World. The white French planters fled to Louisiana by way of Cuba, bringing thousands of enslaved people with them to New Orleans. However, a key historical correction is that the people arriving from the Spanish colony were actually these same French colonists and their slaves. The Destrehan Plantation was involved in a major slave revolt, the 1811 German Coast Uprising Destrehan was appointed to the parish tribunal by Judge Pierre Bauchet St. Martin, as one of five or six men who were to interrogate the accused rebels.

Three swift trials were conducted, one in St. John the Baptist Parish, one at Destrehan Plantation (St. Charles Parish), and the third in New Orleans (Orleans Parish). Local justice was yet based on the traditional French system, which did not provide for a fair and impartial trial or an opportunity for appeal of a court's ruling. (In addition, the judges were slave owners.)

The Destrehan tribunal resulted in the immediate execution of 18 rebels (reportedly by firing squad), including at three of Jean-Noël's former slaves.

=== Stephen Henderson (1773–1838) ===
Ownership changed again after Destréhan's death when his son-in-law Stephen Henderson bought the plantation from the estate in 1855. Henderson was an immigrant from Scotland, who had arrived in the United States penniless but became an extremely wealthy entrepreneur. In 1816, he had married Marie Eléonore "Zelia" Destréhan, who was 16 years old at the time of her marriage; Henderson was 42. Destrehan Plantation was Zelia's childhood home. Zelia died in 1830, childless; and a grief-stricken Henderson died eight years later.

Henderson's will was quite controversial in its time, as it stipulated that all his slaves be freed; and for those that desired, they would be given transport to Liberia. For those who stayed, a factory was to be set up for the freed slaves to manufacture shoes and clothes, and 25 years after his death a city was to be laid out on the grounds of the plantation and named Dunblane. The family contested the will; and after 12 years in litigation and an appeal to the Louisiana Supreme Court, the will was set aside based on a legal technicality.

=== Pierre Adolphe Rost (1797–1868) ===
Pierre Adolphe Rost, a justice of the Louisiana Supreme Court from 1845 to 1853, purchased the plantation from the Henderson estate in 1839. He and his wife, Louise Odile Destréhan, another daughter of Jean-Noël Destréhan, remodeled the house in Greek Revival style. Doors and windows were trimmed in Greek Revival details, the wood columns of the façade were encased in plastered brick, and the rear gallery was enclosed to create an entrance foyer. The winding staircases were removed from the rear gallery and re-installed in the center hall. The exterior stucco was scored to resemble stone.

Upon the advent of the American Civil War, Rost offered his services to the Confederate States of America and was assigned as the C.S.A.'s diplomatic representative in Spain, where he stayed with his family for most of the war. After the Civil War ended in 1865, the plantation was seized by the Freedmen's Bureau, and the Rost Home Colony was established. The plan was for the freedmen to have access to medical and educational aid, in addition to working for wages or for a portion of the harvested crops. The Rost Home Colony was the most successful of those created in Louisiana and provided a profit to the Bureau.

Rost returned from Europe in 1965, with a pardon from President Andrew Johnson, and demanded his property back. The Rost Home Colony existed for an additional year, paying Rost rent, with the last colonist departing in December 1866. Rost died in 1868, and his wife and son, Emile Rost, continued to live at Destrehan Plantation. Emile Rost sold the plantation in 1910 to the Destrehan Planting and Manufacturing Company, ending family ownership of the estate after 123 years.

=== American Oil Company ===
In 1914, the Mexican Petroleum Company, a predecessor of the American Oil Company, bought the property and built an oil refinery. The company tore down the ancillary buildings around the manor house and built employee housing. The mansion was used in a variety of ways including as a clubhouse. In 1959, American Oil tore down the refinery, abandoning the site; the following 12 years brought rapid decay for manor house.

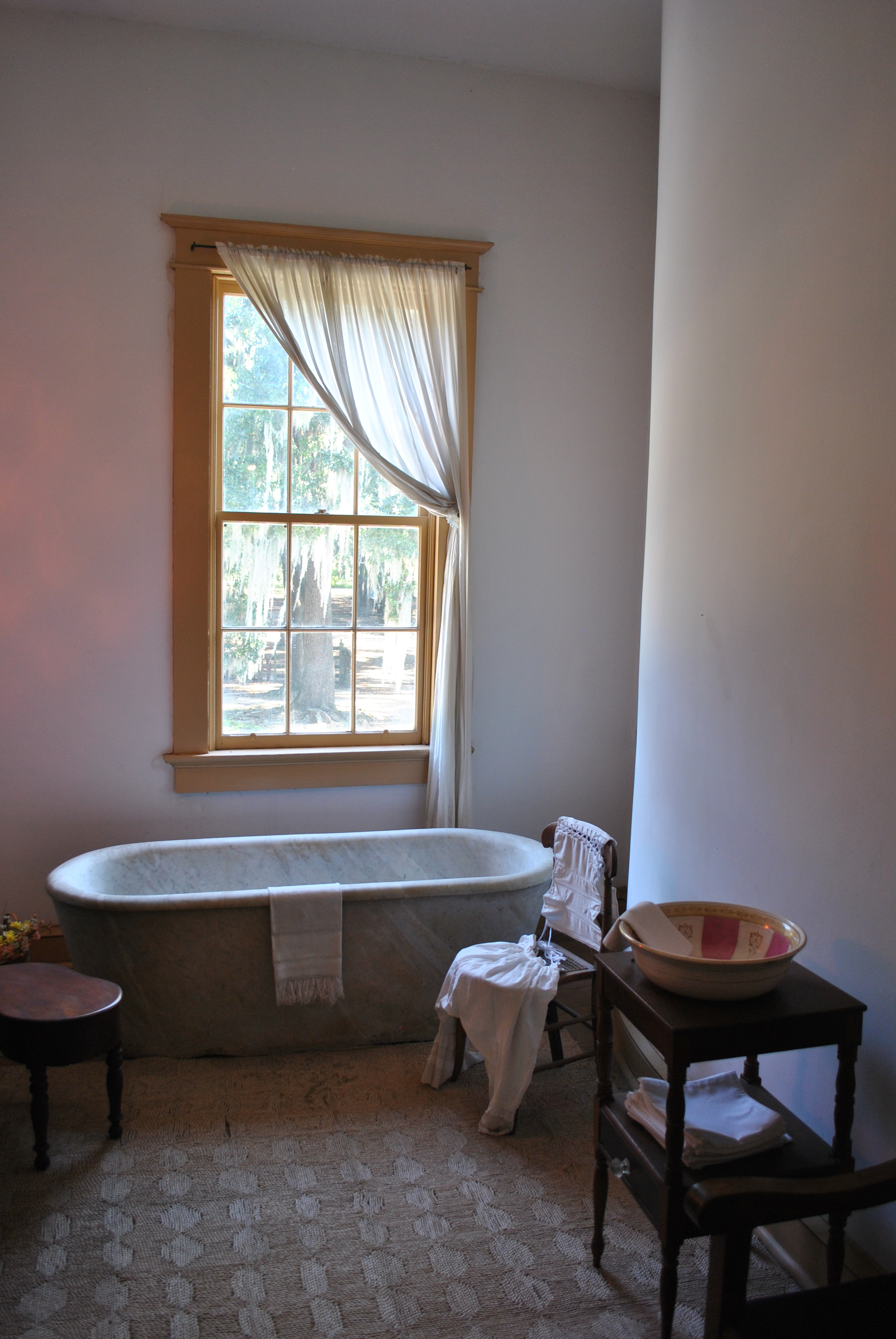
The 1,400 lb (640 kg) marble bathtub, rumored to be a gift from Napoleon Bonaparte to the family

Due in part to an old legend that the privateer Jean Lafitte had hidden treasure in the house, treasure-seekers left gaping holes in the walls. Vandals also stripped the building of its Italian-marble mantels, cypress paneling, Spanish-style ceramic tiles, and glass window panes. A local sheriff prevented the theft of the plantation's original 1840s iron entrance gates and a 1,400 lb (640 kg) marble bathtub, rumored to be a gift from Napoleon Bonaparte to the family.

=== River Road Historical Society ===
In 1971, American Oil donated the house and 4 acres (16,000 m^{2}) of land to the River Road Historical Society, a nonprofit organization. The oil company continued its support in 1990 by donating monies for the installation of a fire sprinkler system and new roof, as well as gifting an additional 12.8 acres (52,000 m^{2}) of surrounding land.

Through its volunteer efforts, the historical society was able to raise sufficient funds to halt the process of decay at the former plantation, restoring the house and grounds to their former beauty. Recent efforts have focused on authentically re-creating the plantation community which would have surrounded the manor house.

Destrehan Plantation is open daily for guided tours, which interpret the lives of the plantation's former residents — both free and enslaved. Period crafts such as dyeing with indigo, candle-making, and open-hearth cooking are demonstrated on most days.

== In popular culture ==
Destrehan Plantation was used as a location in the following feature films and television shows:

=== Feature films ===
- 12 Years a Slave (2013)
- Interview with the Vampire (1994)
- Lemonade - Portions of Beyoncé's film were recorded at Destrehan Plantation (2016)

=== Television shows ===
- Flip My Food with Chef Jeff (2015)
- NCIS: New Orleans (2015)
- Ravenswood (2013)

== See also ==
- History of Louisiana
- History of slavery in Louisiana
- List of plantations in Louisiana
- List of the oldest buildings in Louisiana
- National Register of Historic Places listings in St. Charles Parish, Louisiana
- National Register of Historic Places listings in Louisiana
- Slavery in the colonial United States
- Slavery in the United States
