= Dorvin House =

- U.S. National Register of Historic Places
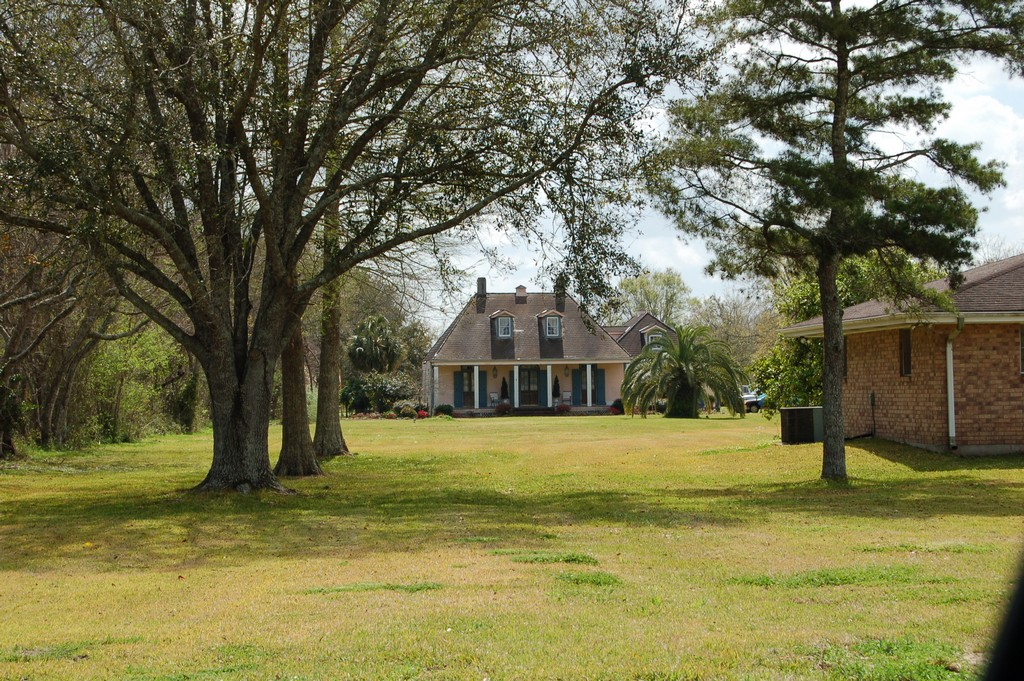

- Location within Louisiana
- Nearest city: Hahnville, Louisiana
- Coordinates: 29°59′18″N 90°25′15″W
- Area: less than one acre
- Built: c.1840-50
- Architectural style: Creole, Greek Revival, Federal
- NRHP reference No.: 90000799
- Added to NRHP: May 24, 1990

Dorvin House, near Hahnville, Louisiana, was built around 1840 to 1850. It was listed on the National Register of Historic Places in 1990. It has also been known as Mollere House and as Rosedon.

The house is a transitional style with elements of both local French architecture but also influenced by national American styles. It is a one-and-a-half-story house built of cypress and briquette entre poteaux (brick between posts) construction. The house is of Creole style, with Creole features including:

1. its steeply pitched hipped roof
2. the briquette entre poteaux wall construction,
3. its "three sets of French doors (six lites per leaf) on the facade and one set at the rear of the original structure",
4. its usage of beaded beam ceilings in the gallery and inside, and
5. four fireplace mantels "which wrap around the chimney flues in the French manner."

Including from renovations, it also includes elements of Greek Revival and Federal style.

It is located on Louisiana Highway 18 northwest of Hahnville. It originally was located facing River Road, 50 feet (15 m) off, but to accommodate a Shell Oil project, it was moved in the 1970s to a location about 450 feet (140 m) off with its view partially obscured by modern houses.
