= Francois Cousin House (Lacombe, Louisiana) =

Historic house in Louisiana, United States

- U.S. National Register of Historic Places
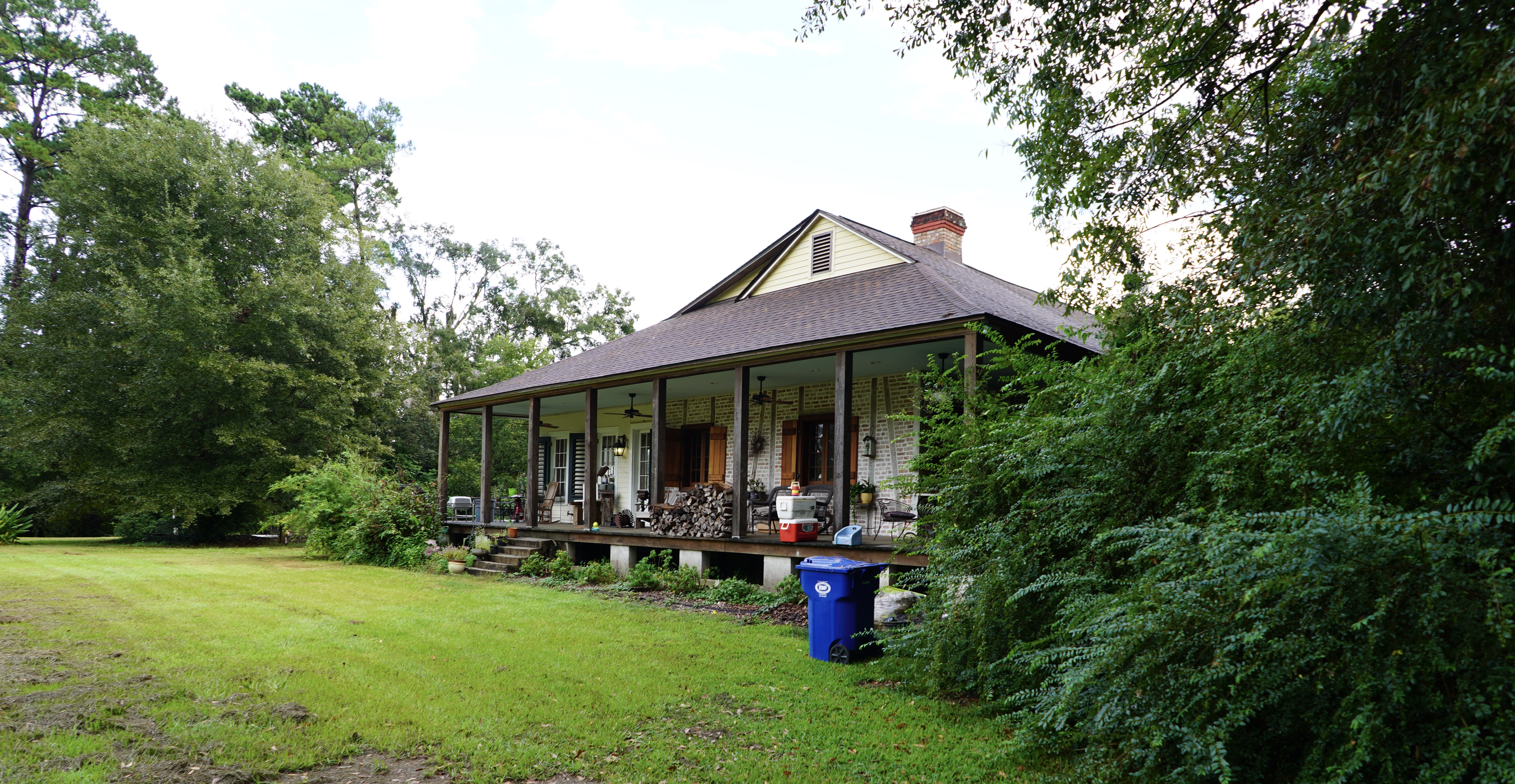

- Location within Louisiana Location within the United States
- Location: 28061 Main St., Lacombe, Louisiana
- Coordinates: 30°18′38″N 89°56′6″W
- Area: 3 acres (1.2 ha)
- Built: c.1790, 1820
- Architectural style: French Colonial, Creole cottage
- MPS: Louisiana's French Creole Architecture MPS
- NRHP reference No.: 02000982
- Added to NRHP: September 16, 2002

The Francois Cousin House at 28061 Main St., Lacombe, Louisiana that appears to have been built in c.1790. It was listed on the National Register of Historic Places in 2002.

It is a one-and-one-half-story French Creole cottage on the west bank of Liberty Bayou. It was expanded at the rear in the late nineteenth or early twentieth century.
