= Francois Cousin House (Slidell, Louisiana) =

Historic house in Louisiana, United States

- U.S. National Register of Historic Places
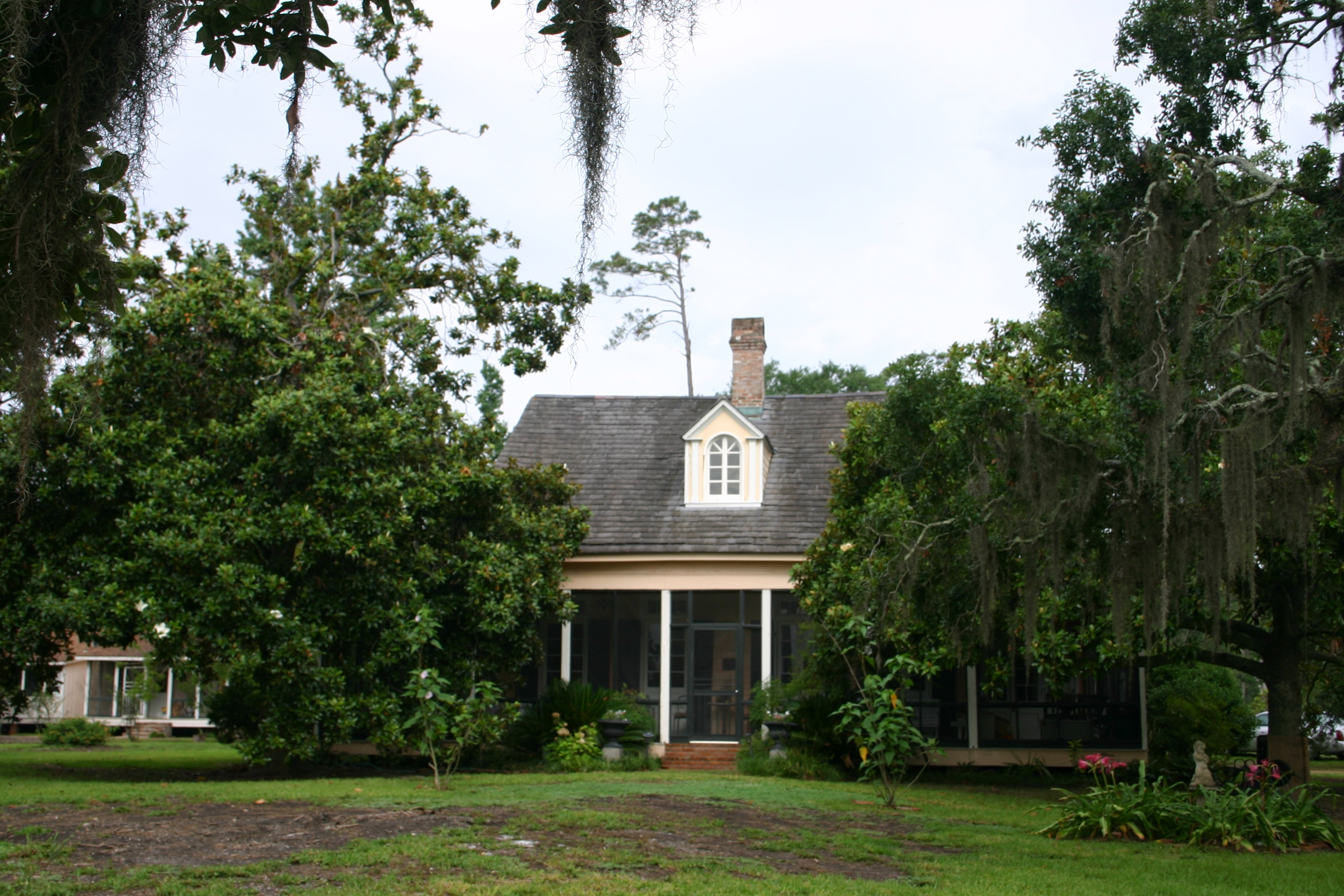

- Location within Louisiana
- Location: 58148 Gwin Rd., Slidell, Louisiana
- Coordinates: 30°16′16.28″N 89°50′6.58″W
- Area: 7.3 acres (3.0 ha)
- Built: 1789
- Architectural style: French Creole
- MPS: Louisiana's French Creole Architecture MPS
- NRHP reference No.: 01000008
- Added to NRHP: January 26, 2001

The Francois Cousin House near Slidell is located in eastern St. Tammany Parish, Louisiana, west of the City of Slidell, Louisiana. The house is a French Creole Cottage, likely built between 1778 and 1790, by Jean Francois Cousin. Cousin, born in 1745 in New Orleans, managed his father's lumber and brick making business interests on the north shore of Lake Pontchartrain. He built this home facing Bayou Liberty which has direct access to Lake Pontchartrain. Behind the home are the pits used to mine the clay. Cousin also owned property in Lacombe, Louisiana.

The core of the home, built c. 1790, was constructed with briquette entre poteaux walls (bricks between posts). The front gallery, running the length of the home, has chamfered gallery columns. Behind the gallery are two rooms of equal size, with one large additional room behind, all served by a central chimney with wrap around mantels. There is a dormer located above this section of the home.

In the late 19th century or early 20th century, an additional three rooms were added to the rear of the home, along with side galleries.

== Hurricane Katrina ==
The home is now owned by William Thompson Lowry who originally bought the home with his late wife Pomeroy Lowry. In 2005, the home was flooded with four feet of water from Hurricane Katrina, and again in 2008 to a much lesser extent by Hurricane Ike. The Lowrys worked with historic preservation offices and the Federal Emergency Management Agency to save the home by raising it while at the same time preserving the home's historic architecture. It was finally finished in May 2011. Permission was received from FEMA and the National Park Service to raise the home in order to preserve it on November 13, 2009. Work began in December 2009 to save the house and was finally finished in November 2011.

Hurricane Katrina also wore away some of the top soil on the property, exposing brick molds and discarded bricks from the Cousin brick business. With the Great New Orleans Fire (1788), followed by the Great New Orleans Fire (1794), destroying most of the buildings in the City of New Orleans, bricks made from the clay on the north shore of Lake Pontchartrain were much in demand. The brick company operated six schooners to carry its products across the lake.

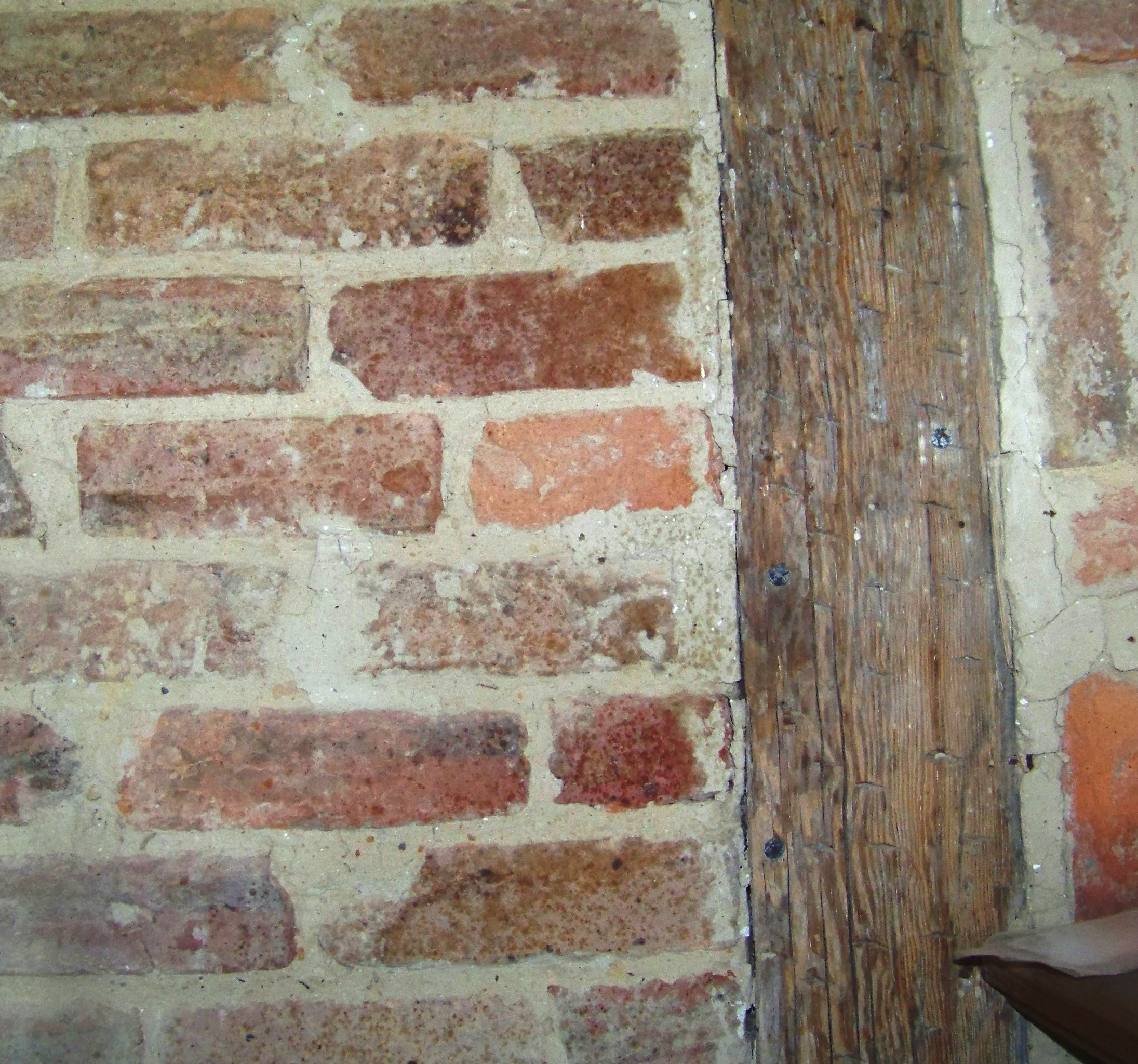
Detail of construction technique, Cousin House. Photo shows original construction, c. 1787–1789. The bricks were made on site. The cypress beams are also believed to have come from the site. The mortar is clay. The plaster, shown over parts of the mortar, consists of human and horse hair, Spanish moss, and other materials.

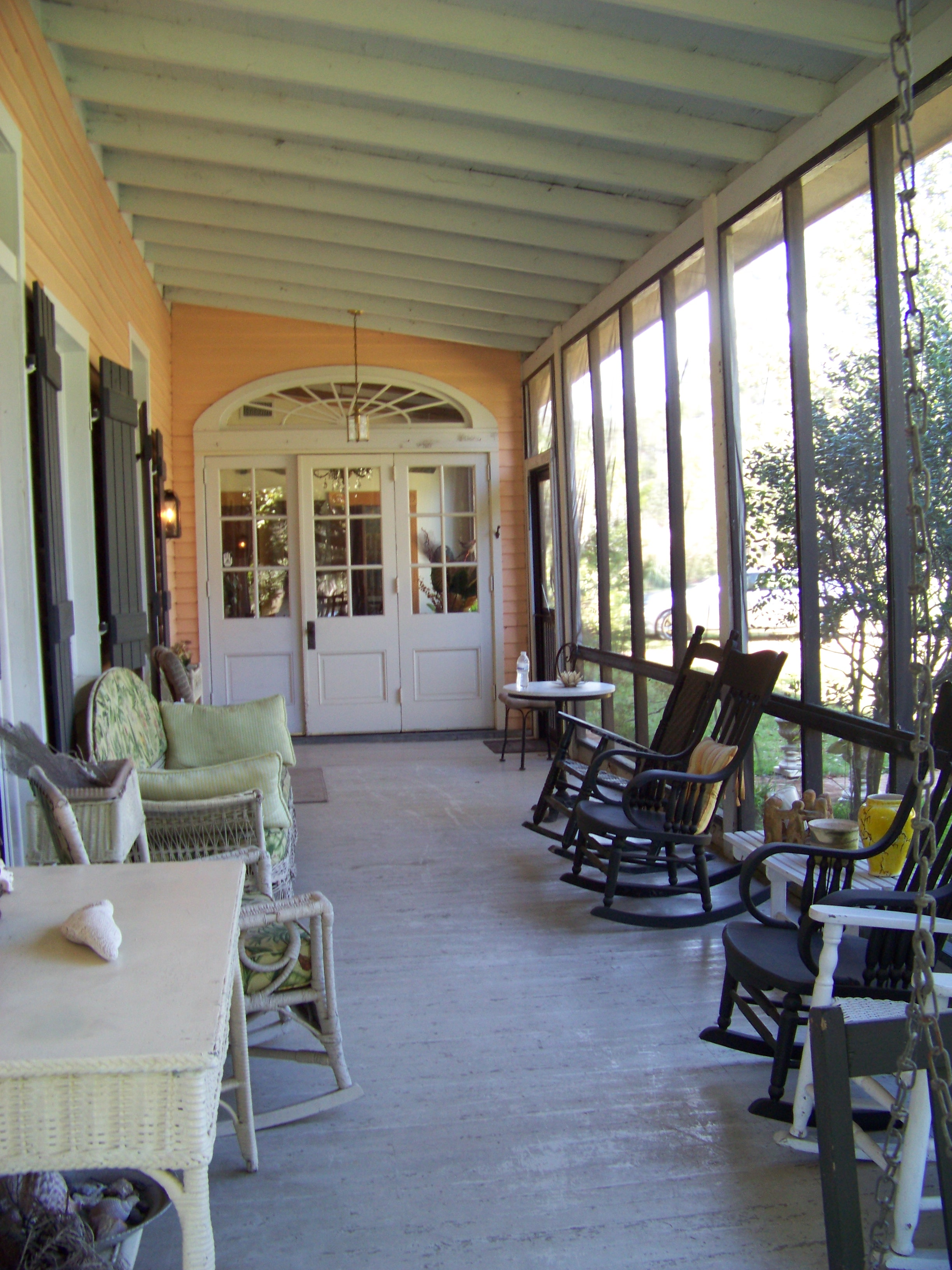
Side gallery added to the Cousin House about 100 years after original construction.

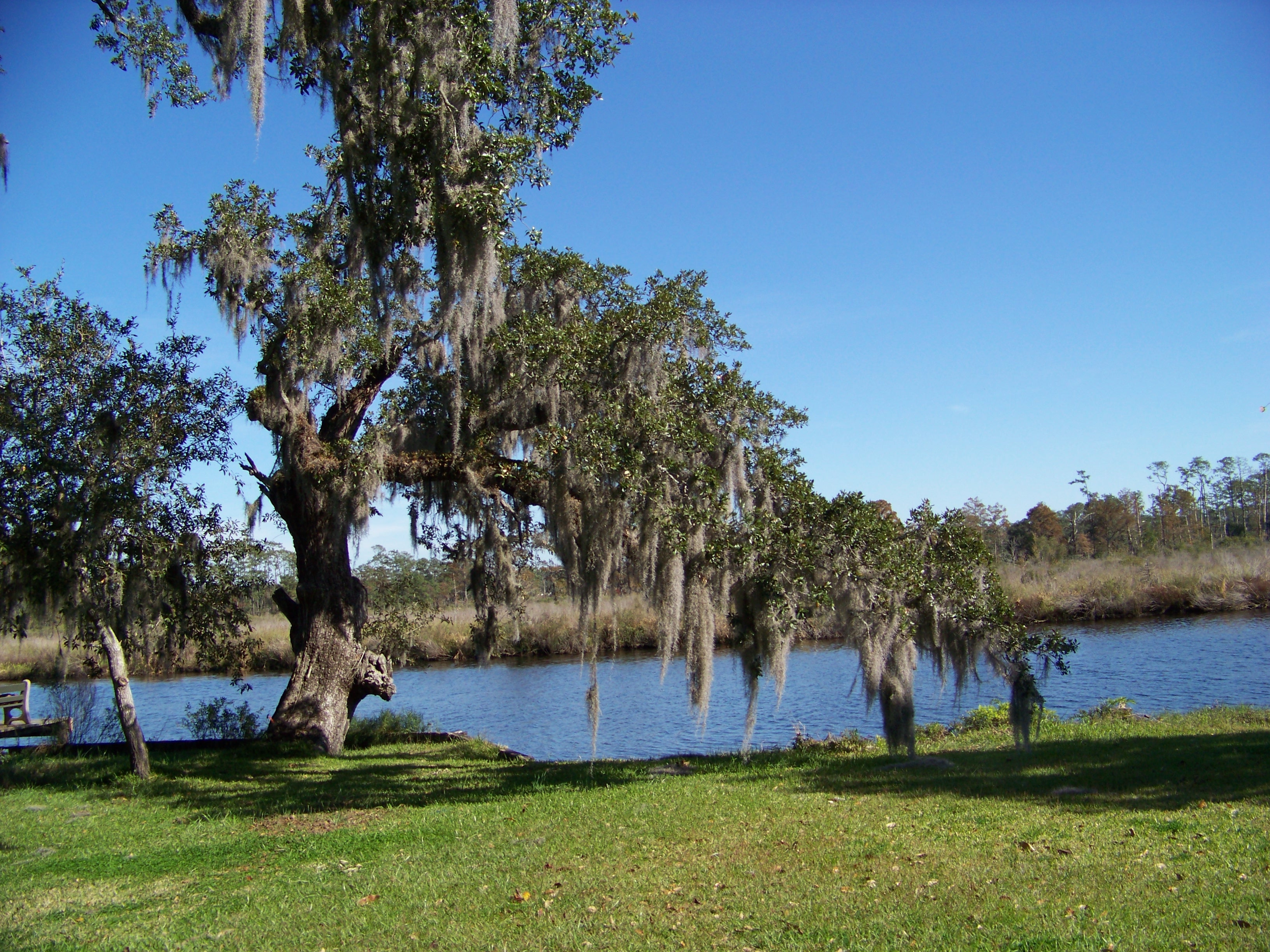
View of Bayou Liberty from Cousin House. The Live Oak survived Hurricane Katrina.
