= Destrehan, Louisiana =

Destrehan
- Census-designated place
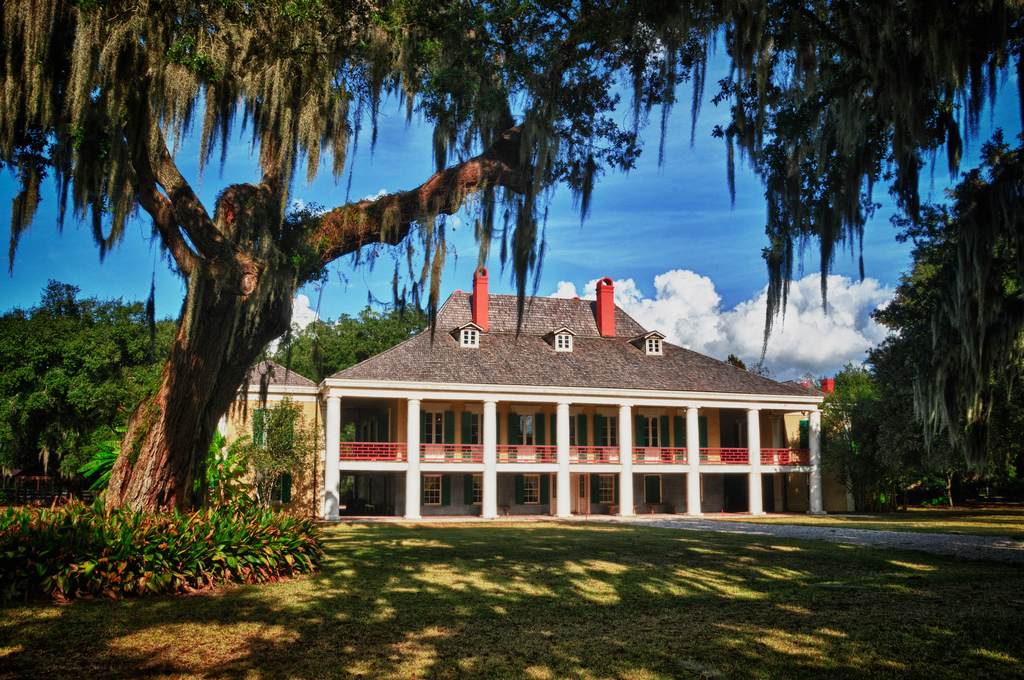
- Destrehan Plantation, est. 1780–1790

- Location of Destrehan in Louisiana
- Coordinates: 29°57′44″N 90°22′09″W
- Country: United States
- State: Louisiana
- Parish: St. Charles
- Named for: Jean Noël Destréhan

Area
  - Total: 6.98 sq mi (18.07 km^{2})
  - Land: 5.97 sq mi (15.46 km^{2})
  - Water: 1.01 sq mi (2.61 km^{2})
- Elevation: 10 ft (3.0 m)

Population (2020)
  - Total: 11,340
  - Density: 1,900.3/sq mi (733.71/km^{2})
- Time zone: UTC-6 (CST)
  - Summer (DST): UTC-5 (CDT)
- Postal code: 70047
- Area code: 985
- FIPS code: 22-20820

Destrehan is an unincorporated community and census-designated place (CDP) in St. Charles Parish, Louisiana, United States. At the 2020 census, its population was 11,340. It is located on the east bank of the Mississippi River. Destrehan is part of the New Orleans—Metairie—Kenner metropolitan statistical area.

== Etymology ==
The community is named after Jean Noël Destréhan (1754–1823), who was twice President of the Orleans Territory's legislative council during his service there in 1806 and 1811. He was elected to the United States Senate when Louisiana became a state in 1812, but he resigned after a month. He served in the Louisiana State Senate from 1812 to 1817.

Destrehan Plantation, his former home, is listed on the National Register of Historic Places. The main house has been restored and is one of the attractions on the Great River Road along the Mississippi River.

== Geography ==
Destrehan is located at 29°57′44″N 90°22′9″W (29.962307, -90.369160).

According to the United States Census Bureau, the CDP has a total area of 7.9 square miles (20 km^{2}), of which 6.9 square miles (18 km^{2}) are land and 1.0-square-mile (2.6 km^{2}) (12.41%) is water.

== Demographics ==
Historical population
Census	Pop.	Note	%±
1980	2,382		—
1990	8,031		237.2%
2000	11,260		40.2%
2010	11,535		2.4%
2020	11,340		−1.7%
U.S. Decennial Census; 1950 1960 1970 1980; 1990 2000 2010

Destrehan first appeared as census designated place in the 1980 U.S. census.

Destrehan racial composition as of 2020
Race	Number	Percentage
White (non-Hispanic)	7,787	68.67%
Black or African American (non-Hispanic)	1,876	16.54%
Native American	33	0.29%
Asian	161	1.42%
Pacific Islander	10	0.09%
Other/Mixed	424	3.74%
Hispanic or Latino	1,049	9.25%

As of the 2020 United States census, there were 11,340 people, 4,257 households, and 3,334 families residing in the CDP.

== Education ==
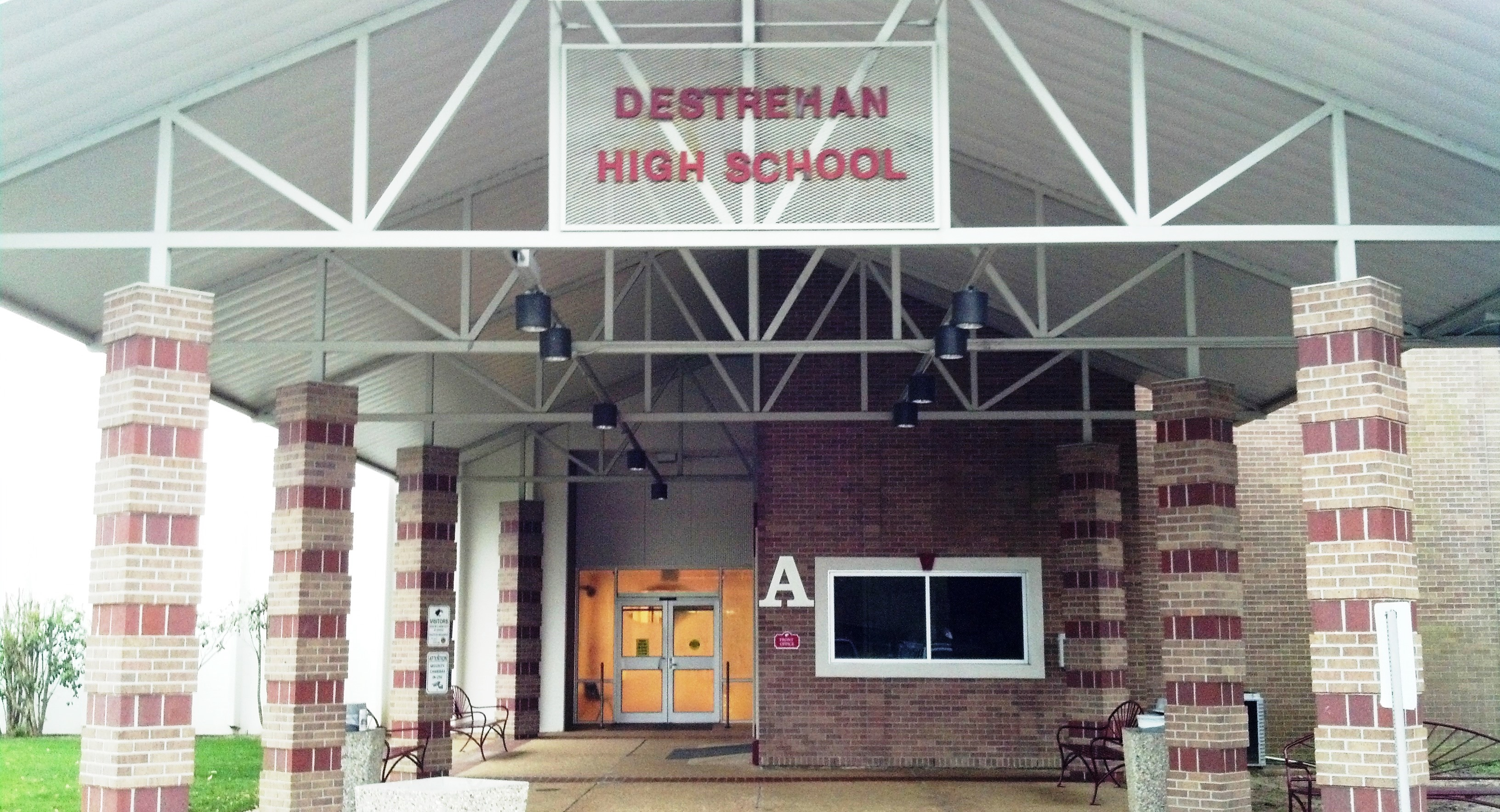
Destrehan High School

St. Charles Parish Public School System operates public schools:

- Destrehan High School (9–12)
- Harry M. Hurst Middle School (Formerly 7–8 & presently 6–8)
- Ethel Schoeffner Elementary School (Formerly 4–6 & presently 3–5)
- New Sarpy Elementary School (Formerly PK–3 & presently PK–2)

== In popular culture ==
Destrehan Plantation was used as a set in the film 12 Years a Slave (2013).

== Notable people ==
- Paul Boudreau, assistant coach of the New Orleans Saints
- Paul F. Boudreau, NFL and CFL assistant coach
- Joel T. Chaisson, II, District Attorney and Louisiana State Senate President
- Jean Noël Destréhan, U.S. Senator
- Jesse Duplantis, televangelist
- Hoffman Franklin Fuller, professor-emeritus at Tulane University Law School and Bossier City mayor
- Shelley Hennig, actress and Miss Teen USA 2004
- Dalton Hilliard, NFL running back for the New Orleans Saints
- Joe Horn, NFL wide receiver for the Kansas City Chiefs, New Orleans Saints and Atlanta Falcons
- Justin Jefferson, wide receiver for Louisiana State University and Minnesota Vikings
- Harry J. Kember Jr., member of the Louisiana House of Representatives
- Tanner Lee, NFL quarterback for the Jacksonville Jaguars
- Glen Logan, NFL defensive tackle for the Cleveland Browns
- Kirk Merritt, NFL wide receiver for the Miami Dolphins and New Orleans Saints
- Gregory A. Miller, member of the Louisiana House of Representatives
- Jim E. Mora, head coach of the New Orleans Saints
- Bum Phillips, head coach of the New Orleans Saints
- Ed Reed, NFL safety for the Baltimore Ravens
- Mike Scifres, NFL punter for the San Diego Chargers
- Hubert Shurtz, NFL tackle with the Philadelphia Eagles
- Byron O. Thomas, known by stage name Mannie Fresh, rapper and producer
- Devon Walker, safety for Tulane University and New Orleans Saints

== See also ==
- St. Charles Borromeo Church (Destrehan, Louisiana)
- Ormond Plantation House
