= Louisiana's 56th House of Representatives district =

American legislative district

Louisiana's 56th State House of Representatives district
Representative
Beth Anne Billings; R–Destrehan

Louisiana's 56th House of Representatives district is one of 105 Louisiana House of Representatives districts. It is currently represented by Republican Beth Anne Billings of Destrehan.

== Geography ==
HD56 represents the far-western border area of New Orleans, including the communities of Destrehan and Norco.

== Election results ==
Year	Winning candidate	Party	Percent	Opponent	Party	Percent
2011	Gregory A. Miller	Republican	62.3%	G. Ramachandran	Democratic	37.7%
2015	Gregory A. Miller	Republican	100%			
2019	Gregory A. Miller	Republican	100%			
2023	Beth Billings	Republican	Cancelled			
