= Louisiana's 19th State Senate district =

American legislative district

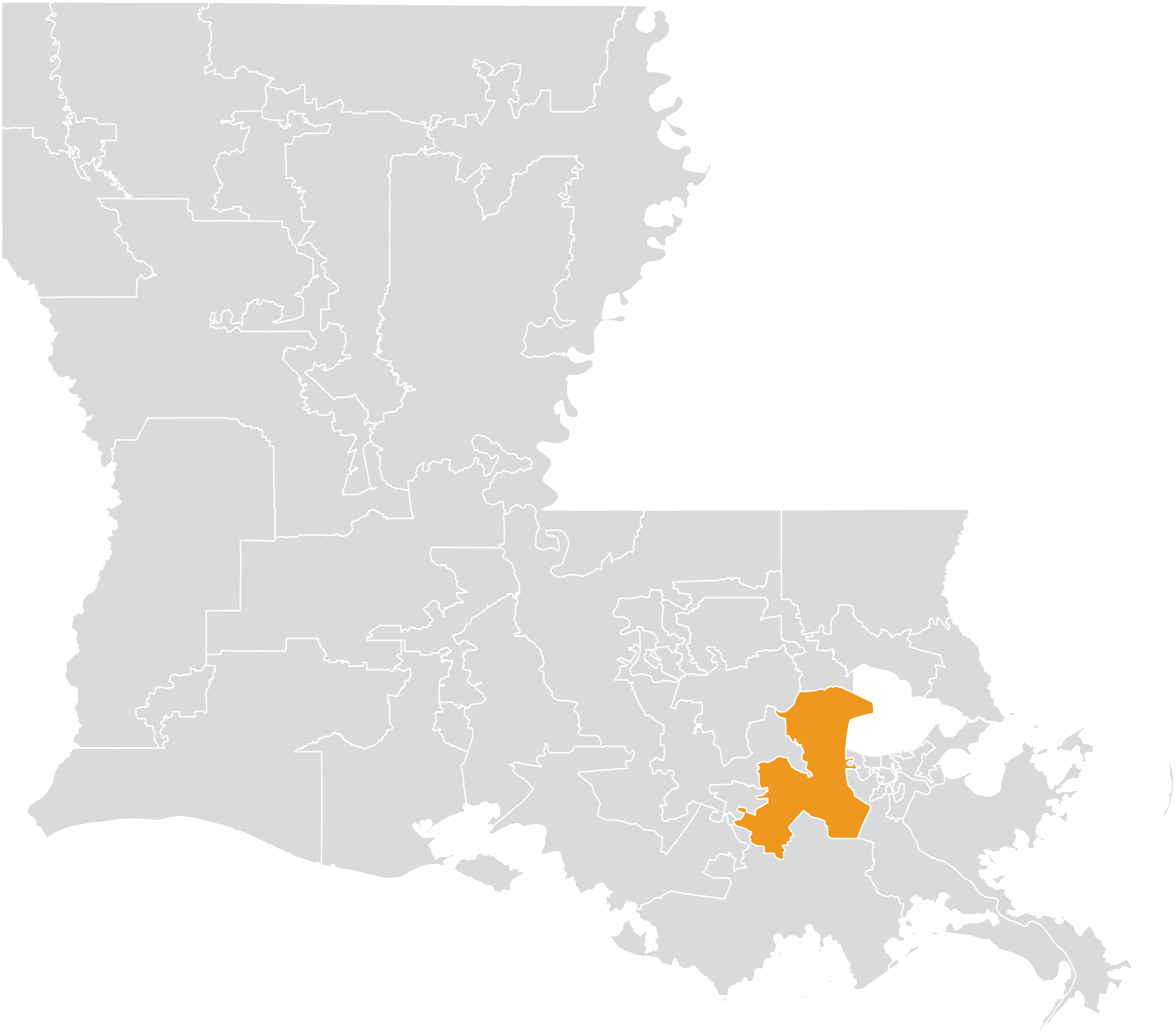
Senator
| Gregory A. Miller; R–Norco |
- Registration: 45.6% Democratic; 27.6% Republican; 26.8% No party preference
- Demographics: 54% White; 35% Black; 8% Hispanic; 1% Asian; 1% Native American; 2% Other
- Population (2019): 111,000
- Registered voters: 70,737

Louisiana's 19th State Senate district is one of 39 districts in the Louisiana State Senate. It has been represented by Republican Gregory A. Miller since 2024.

== Geography ==
District 19 covers parts of Jefferson, Lafourche, St. Charles, and St. John the Baptist Parishes along Lake Pontchartrain in Greater New Orleans, including some or all of LaPlace, Norco, Hahnville, Boutte, Des Allemands, Destrehan, Luling, St. Rose, Kenner, and Raceland. The district also includes a sizable portion of Lake Pontchartrain itself, hence its unusual shape.

The district overlaps with Louisiana's 1st, 2nd, and 6th congressional districts, and with the 54th, 55th, 56th, 57th, and 92nd districts of the Louisiana House of Representatives.

== Recent election results ==
Louisiana uses a jungle primary system. If no candidate receives 50% in the first round of voting, when all candidates appear on the same ballot regardless of party, the top-two finishers advance to a runoff election.

=== 2019 ===
2019 Louisiana State Senate election, District 19
| Party | Candidate | Votes | % |
|---|---|---|---|
| Democratic | Gary Smith Jr. (incumbent) | Unopposed | 100 |
| Total votes | | Unopposed | 100 |
| Democratic hold | | | |

=== 2015 ===
2015 Louisiana State Senate election, District 19
| Party | Candidate | Votes | % |
|---|---|---|---|
| Democratic | Gary Smith Jr. (incumbent) | Unopposed | 100 |
| Total votes | | Unopposed | 100 |
| Democratic hold | | | |

=== 2011 ===
2011 Louisiana State Senate election, District 19
| Party | Candidate | Votes | % |
|---|---|---|---|
| Democratic | Gary Smith Jr. | 16,501 | 59.5 |
| Republican | Garrett Monti | 11,215 | 40.5 |
| Total votes | | 27,716 | 100 |
| Democratic hold | | | |

=== Federal and statewide results ===
| Year | Office | Results |
|---|---|---|
| 2020 | President | Trump 56.8–41.6% |
| 2019 | Governor (runoff) | Edwards 56.0–44.0% |
| 2016 | President | Trump 56.4–40.4% |
| 2015 | Governor (runoff) | Edwards 55.7–44.3% |
| 2014 | Senate (runoff) | Landrieu 50.5–49.5% |
| 2012 | President | Romney 55.3–42.9% |
