= LaBranche Wetlands Bridge =

- Coordinates: 29°58′38″N 90°19′00″W
- Carries: 4 lanes of I-310
- Crosses: LaBranche Wetlands
- Locale: St. Charles Parish
- Maintained by: LA DOTD

Characteristics
- Total length: 7,902 meters (25,925 feet)

History
- Opened: 1992

Location
- Interactive map of LaBranche Wetlands Bridge

The LaBranche Wetlands Bridge is a concrete trestle bridge in the U.S. state of Louisiana. With a total length of 25,925 feet (7,902 m; 4.9100 mi), it is one of the longest bridges in the world. The bridge carries Interstate 310 over the LaBranche Wetlands in St. Charles Parish. The bridge opened in 1992.

The LaBranche Wetlands Bridge was constructed using a method known as "end-on construction" to avoid damaging the environmentally sensitive LaBranche Wetlands. This is a top-down technique in which construction platforms are mounted on concrete piles to avoid disrupting the environment below. From these platforms, the next set of piles and bridge viaducts are placed, allowing the platform to progress forward for the next set. The bridge won the 1992 Build America award in the Highway Division category.

== See also ==
- List of bridges in the United States
- List of longest bridges in the world
