= List of bridges in the United States =

This is a list of the major current and former bridges in the United States. For a more expansive list, see List of bridges in the United States by state.

== Major bridges ==
This table presents a non-exhaustive list of the road and railway bridges with spans greater than 300 meters (984 ft).

	Name	Span	Length	Type	Carries Crosses	Opened	Location	State	Ref.
1	Verrazzano–Narrows Bridge	1,298 m (4,260 ft)	4,176 m (13,701 ft)	Suspension; 2 levels steel truss deck, steel pylons 7+6 lanes 370+1298+370	Interstate 278; The Narrows	1964	New York City; Staten Island–Brooklyn; 40°36′23″N 74°2′43.2″W	New York	(Note: The Verrazzano–Narrows Bridge held the record of the longest bridge span in the world from 1964 to 1981.)
2	Golden Gate Bridge	1,280 m (4,200 ft)	2,737 m (8,980 ft)	Suspension; Steel truss deck, steel pylons 2x3 lanes 343+1280+343	U.S. Route 101; California State Route 1 Golden Gate	1937	San Francisco–Sausalito; 37°49′9.5″N 122°28′43.9″W	California	(Note: At the time of its opening in 1937, the Golden Gate Bridge was the longest and the tallest suspension bridge in the world, titles it held until 1964 and 1998 respectively. The American Society of Civil Engineers named it one of the 7 Wonders of the Modern World, and it was declared California Historical Landmark in 1987.)
3	Mackinac Bridge	1,158 m (3,800 ft)	8,038 m (26,371 ft)	Suspension; Steel truss deck, steel pylons 2x2 lanes 548+1158+548	Interstate 75; Straits of Mackinac	1957	Mackinaw City–St. Ignace; 45°48′56″N 84°43′40.6″W	Michigan	
4	George Washington Bridge	1,067 m (3,500 ft)	1,451 m (4,760 ft)	Suspension; 2 levels steel truss deck, steel pylons 8+6 lanes 186+1067+198	Interstate 95; U.S. Route 1/9; U.S. Route 46; Hudson River	1931	New York City–Fort Lee; 40°51′6.2″N 73°57′9.8″W	New York; New Jersey	(Note: The George Washington Bridge was the first bridge span to reach a length of over one kilometer, it was the longest main bridge span in the world from its 1931 opening until the Golden Gate Bridge in San Francisco opened in 1937. It was designated a National Historic Civil Engineering Landmark in 1981.)
5	Tacoma Narrows Bridge (1950); East bridge	853 m (2,800 ft)	1,822 m (5,978 ft)	Suspension; Steel truss deck, steel pylons 3 lanes 335+853+335	Washington State Route 16; Puget Sound	1950	Tacoma; 47°16′5.6″N 122°33′0.7″W	Washington	
6	Tacoma Narrows Bridge; West bridge	853 m (2,800 ft)	1,646 m (5,400 ft)	Suspension; Steel truss deck, concrete pylons 3 lanes 427+853+366	Washington State Route 16; Puget Sound	2007	Tacoma; 47°16′4.4″N 122°33′2.8″W	Washington	
7	Gordie Howe International Bridge	853 m (2,800 ft)	2,500 m (8,200 ft)	Cable-stayed; Composite steel/concrete deck, concrete pylons 2x3 lanes	Road bridge Detroit River	2026	Detroit–Windsor; 42°17′14.3″N 83°05′53.1″W	Michigan; Canada	
8	Alfred Zampa Memorial Bridge	728 m (2,388 ft)	1,056 m (3,465 ft)	Suspension; Steel box girder deck, concrete pylons 4 lanes 148+728+183	Interstate 80; Carquinez Strait	2003	Vallejo–Crockett; 38°3′39.7″N 122°13′35.5″W	California	
9	San Francisco–Oakland Bay Bridge; West bridge	704 m (2,310 ft) (x2)	3,141 m (10,305 ft)	Suspension; 2 levels steel truss deck, steel pylons 2x5 lanes 357+704+353+52 +353+704+353	Interstate 80; San Francisco Bay	1936	San Francisco–Yerba Buena Island; 37°48′12.2″N 122°22′18.9″W	California	
10	Bronx–Whitestone Bridge	701 m (2,300 ft)	2,242 m (7,356 ft)	Suspension; Steel girder deck, steel pylons 2x3 lanes 224+701+224	Interstate 678; East River	1939	New York City; The Bronx–Queens; 40°48′6.7″N 73°49′47.2″W	New York	
11	Delaware Memorial Bridge	655 m (2,150 ft)	3,291 m (10,797 ft)	Suspension; Steel truss deck, steel pylons Twin bridges 4 lanes 229+655+229	Interstate 295; U.S. Route 40; Delaware River	1951; 1968	New Castle–Pennsville; 39°41′18.2″N 75°31′6.2″W	Delaware; New Jersey	
12	Walt Whitman Bridge	610 m (2,000 ft)	3,652 m (11,982 ft)	Suspension; Steel truss deck, steel pylons 3+4 lanes 235+610+235	Interstate 76; Delaware River	1957	Philadelphia–Gloucester City; 39°54′18.7″N 75°7′46.1″W	Pennsylvania; New Jersey	
13	Ambassador Bridge	564 m (1,850 ft)	2,286 m (7,500 ft)	Suspension; Steel truss deck, steel pylons 2x2 lanes	Road bridge Detroit River	1929	Detroit–Windsor; 42°18′43.2″N 83°4′27.2″W	Michigan; Canada	(Note: The Ambassador Bridge became the longest span in the world in 1929 until 1931, it surpassed the record of the Quebec Bridge in Canada and since that date the record for longest bridge span has only been held by suspension bridges.)
14	Throgs Neck Bridge	549 m (1,800 ft)	3,430 m (11,250 ft)	Suspension; Steel truss deck, steel pylons 2x3 lanes 169+549+169	Interstate 295; East River	1961	New York City; The Bronx–Queens; 40°48′0.9″N 73°47′36″W	New York	
15	Benjamin Franklin Bridge	534 m (1,750 ft)	2,273 m (7,457 ft)	Suspension; Steel truss deck, steel pylons 3+4 lanes 2 railway tracks 218+534+218	Interstate 676; U.S. Route 30; PATCO Speedline; Delaware River	1926	Philadelphia–Camden; 39°57′10.5″N 75°8′3.3″W	Pennsylvania; New Jersey	(Note: From 1926 to 1929, the Benjamin Franklin Bridge had the longest span of any suspension bridge in the world.)
16	New River Gorge Bridge	518 m (1,700 ft)	924 m (3,031 ft)	Arch; Steel deck arch 2x2 lanes	U.S. Route 19; New River	1977	Fayetteville; 38°4′8.6″N 81°4′58.2″W	West Virginia	(Note: The New River Gorge Bridge was the world's longest arch bridge for 26 years, until the opening of the Lupu Bridge in China, it was listed on the National Register of Historic Places in 2013.)
17	Bayonne Bridge	510 m (1,670 ft)	1,762 m (5,781 ft)	Arch; Steel through arch 2x2 lanes	New York State Route 440; New Jersey Route 440; Kill Van Kull	1931	New York City–Bayonne; 40°38′30.7″N 74°8′31.5″W	New York; New Jersey	(Note: When completed in 1931, the Bayonne Bridge was the longest steel arch bridge in the world, it was designated as a National Historic Civil Engineering Landmark in 1985.)
18	Harbor Bridge Project under construction	506.4 m (1,661 ft)	3,298 m (10,820 ft)	Cable-stayed; Concrete box girder deck, concrete pylons 2x3 lanes 248+506+248	U.S. Route 181; Texas State Highway 35; Corpus Christi Ship Channel	2025	Corpus Christi; 27°48′48.7″N 97°23′57.9″W	Texas	
19	Commodore Barry Bridge	501 m (1,644 ft)	4,240 m (13,910 ft)	Cantilever; Steel; 2+3 lanes 251+501+251	U.S. Route 322; County Route 536; Delaware River	1974	Chester–Bridgeport; 39°49′42.2″N 75°22′17.3″W	Pennsylvania; New Jersey	
20	Bear Mountain Bridge	497 m (1,631 ft)	688 m (2,257 ft)	Suspension; Steel truss deck, steel pylons 2x2 lanes 64+497+64	U.S. Route 6 U.S. Route 202; Hudson River	1924	Bear Mountain State Park–Cortlandt; 41°19′11.3″N 73°58′59.7″W	New York	(Note: The Bear Mountain Bridge broke the record of the longest suspension bridge from 1924 to 1926, it was added to the National Historic Civil Engineering Landmarks in 1986 and on the National Register of Historic Places in 1982.)
21	Williamsburg Bridge	488 m (1,600 ft)	2,227 m (7,306 ft)	Suspension; Steel truss deck, steel pylons 2x4 lanes 2 subway lanes	New York State Route 27A; New York City Subway ( trains lines); East River	1903	New York City; Manhattan–Brooklyn; 40°42′48.4″N 73°58′18.6″W	New York	(Note: The Williamsburg Bridge was the longest suspension bridge in the world from 1903 until 1924, it was designated as a National Historic Civil Engineering Landmark in 2009.)
22	Chesapeake Bay Bridge; South bridge	488 m (1,600 ft)	6,484 m (21,273 ft)	Suspension; Steel truss deck, steel pylons 2 lanes 201+488+201	U.S. Route 50; U.S. Route 301; Chesapeake Bay	1952	Anne Arundel County–Queen Anne's County; 38°59′35.4″N 76°22′55.3″W	Maryland	
23	Chesapeake Bay Bridge; North bridge	488 m (1,600 ft)	6,415 m (21,047 ft)	Suspension; Steel truss deck, steel pylons 3 lanes	U.S. Route 50; U.S. Route 301; Chesapeake Bay	1973	Anne Arundel County–Queen Anne's County; 38°59′39.6″N 76°22′53.9″W	Maryland	
24	Claiborne Pell Newport Bridge	488 m (1,600 ft)	3,428 m (11,247 ft)	Suspension; Steel truss deck, steel pylons 2x2 lanes 210+488+210	Rhode Island Route 138; Narragansett Bay	1969	Newport–Jamestown; 41°30′17.9″N 71°20′55.1″W	Rhode Island	
25	Brooklyn Bridge	486 m (1,594 ft)	1,825 m (5,988 ft)	Suspension with cable-stays Steel truss deck, masonry pylons 2+3 lanes 283+486+283	Road bridge East River	1883	New York City; Manhattan–Brooklyn; 40°42′20.4″N 73°59′46.8″W	New York	(Note: Former railroad bridge designed by John A. Roebling, it was the longest span in the world at the time of its opening and has been designated a National Historic Landmark, a New York City landmark in 1967, a National Historic Civil Engineering Landmark in 1972 and listed on the National Register of Historic Places in 1966.)
26	John James Audubon Bridge	482 m (1,581 ft)	3,927 m (12,884 ft)	Cable-stayed; Composite steel/concrete deck, concrete pylons 2x2 lanes 195+482+195	Louisiana Highway 10; Lower Mississippi River	2011	Pointe Coupee Parish–West Feliciana Parish; 30°43′13.2″N 91°21′5.1″W	Louisiana	
27	Crescent City Connection	480 m (1,575 ft)	4,093 m (13,428 ft)	Cantilever; Steel; Twin bridges 2x4 lanes 260+486+180	U.S. Route 90 Business; Interstate 910; Mississippi River	1958; 1988	New Orleans; 29°56′16.1″N 90°3′23.6″W	Louisiana	
28	Arthur Ravenel Jr. Bridge	471 m (1,545 ft)	4,023.3 m (13,200 ft)	Cable-stayed; Composite steel/concrete deck, concrete pylons 2x4 lanes 198+471+198	U.S. Route 17; Cooper River	2005	Charleston–Mount Pleasant; 32°48′10.5″N 79°54′55.3″W	South Carolina	
29	Vincent Thomas Bridge	457 m (1,500 ft)	1,848 m (6,063 ft)	Suspension; Steel truss deck, steel pylons 2x2 lanes 154+457+154	California State Route 47; Los Angeles Harbor	1963	Los Angeles; San Pedro–Terminal Island; 33°44′58″N 118°16′17.8″W	California	
30	Stan Musial Veterans Memorial Bridge	457 m (1,500 ft)	854 m (2,800 ft)	Cable-stayed; Composite steel/concrete deck, concrete pylons 2x2 lanes 194+457+194	Interstate 70; Mississippi River	2014	St. Louis–St. Clair County; 38°38′45.1″N 90°10′41.8″W	Missouri; Missouri	
31	Mid-Hudson Bridge	456 m (1,495 ft)	914 m (2,999 ft)	Suspension; Steel truss deck, steel pylons 3 lanes 228+456+230	U.S. Route 44; New York State Route 55; Hudson River	1930	Highland–Poughkeepsie; 41°42′10.3″N 73°56′46.4″W	New York	
32	Manhattan Bridge	448 m (1,470 ft)	2,089 m (6,854 ft)	Suspension; Steel truss deck, steel pylons 7 road lanes 4 railway tracks	Road bridge New York City Subway ( lines); East River	1909	New York City; Manhattan–Brooklyn; 40°42′24.4″N 73°59′25.5″W	New York	(Note: The Manhattan Bridge has been designated a National Historic Civil Engineering Landmark in 2009 and listed on the National Register of Historic Places in 1983.)
33	Gramercy Bridge	445 m (1,460 ft)	945 m (3,100 ft)	Cantilever; Steel; 2x2 lanes	Louisiana Highway 3213; Mississippi River	1995	Gramercy–Wallace; 30°2′47.6″N 90°40′22.9″W	Louisiana	
34	Robert F. Kennedy Bridge	421 m (1,380 ft)	4,212 m (13,819 ft)	Suspension; Steel truss deck, steel pylons 2x4 lanes 205+421+205	Interstate 278; East River	1936	New York City; Manhattan–Queens; 40°46′46.5″N 73°55′35.7″W	New York	(Note: Also called Triborough Bridge, it was designated as a National Historic Civil Engineering Landmark in 1986.)
35	Greenville Bridge	420 m (1,380 ft)	4,133 m (13,560 ft)	Cable-stayed; Composite steel/concrete deck, concrete pylons 2x2 lanes 181+420+181	U.S. Route 82; U.S. Route 278; Mississippi River	2010	Refuge–Shives; 33°17′13.2″N 91°9′15.3″W	Mississippi; Arkansas	
36	Sam Houston Ship Channel Bridge Replacement under construction	402.4 m (1,320 ft)	3,500 m (11,500 ft)	Cable-stayed; 2x4 lanes	Sam Houston Tollway; Houston Ship Channel	2025	Harris County, Texas; 29°44′10.1″N 95°08′48″W	Texas	
37	Dames Point Bridge	396 m (1,300 ft)	3,245 m (10,646 ft)	Cable-stayed; Concrete deck, concrete pylons 2x3 lanes 198+396+198	Interstate 295; Florida State Road 9A; Jacksonville Eastern Beltway; St. Johns River	1989	Jacksonville; 30°23′4.1″N 81°33′24.8″W	Florida	
38	San Francisco–Oakland Bay Bridge; East bridge	385 m (1,263 ft)	3,540 m (11,610 ft)	Suspension; Self-anchored, steel box girder deck, 1 steel pylon 2x5 lanes 385+180	Interstate 80; San Francisco Bay	2013	San Francisco–Oakland; 37°48′59.0″N 122°21′24.2″W	California	
39	Fremont Bridge	382 m (1,255 ft)	656 m (2,152 ft)	Arch; 2 levels steel through arch 2x4 lanes 137+382+137	Interstate 405; U.S. Route 30; Willamette River	1973	Portland; 45°32′16.6″N 122°40′58.6″W	Oregon	
40	Sidney Lanier Bridge	381 m (1,250 ft)	2,371 m (7,779 ft)	Cable-stayed; Concrete deck, concrete pylons 2x2 lanes 190+381+190	U.S. Route 17; Brunswick River	2003	Brunswick; 31°6′57.6″N 81°29′6.5″W	Georgia	
41	Fred Hartman Bridge	381 m (1,250 ft)	4,185 m (13,730 ft)	Cable-stayed; Composite steel/concrete deck, concrete pylons Twin bridges 2x4 lanes 147+381+147	Texas State Highway 146; Houston Ship Channel	1995	Baytown–La Porte; 29°42′13.7″N 95°1′0.3″W	Texas	
42	Astoria–Megler Bridge	376 m (1,234 ft)	6,545 m (21,473 ft)	Truss; Steel; 2 lanes 189+376+189	U.S. Route 101; Columbia River	1966	Astoria–Megler; 46°11′37″N 123°51′3.2″W	Oregon; Washington	
43	Horace Wilkinson Bridge	376 m (1,234 ft)	4,313 m (14,150 ft)	Cantilever; Steel; 2x3 lanes	Interstate 10; Mississippi River	1968	Baton Rouge–Port Allen; 30°26′22.6″N 91°11′55.3″W	Louisiana	
44	Hale Boggs Memorial Bridge	372 m (1,220 ft)	3,261 m (10,699 ft)	Cable-stayed; Steel box girder deck, steel pylons 2x2 lanes 151+372+155	Interstate 310; Mississippi River	1983	Luling–Destrehan; 29°56′28.2″N 90°22′29″W	Louisiana	
45	Tappan Zee Bridge	370 m (1,215 ft)	4,989 m (16,368 ft)	Cable-stayed; Composite steel/concrete deck, concrete pylons Twin bridges 2x5 lanes 157+366+157	Interstate 87; Interstate 287; New York State Thruway; Hudson River	2017	Tarrytown–South Nyack; 41°04′16.2″N 73°52′51.9″W	New York	
46	St. Johns Bridge	368 m (1,207 ft)	1,168 m (3,832 ft)	Suspension; Steel girder deck, steel pylons 2x2 lanes 131+368+131	U.S. Route 30 Bypass; Willamette River	1931	Portland; 45°35′6.8″N 122°45′53.1″W	Oregon	
47	Mount Hope Bridge	366 m (1,200 ft)	1,868 m (6,129 ft)	Suspension; Steel truss deck, steel pylons 2 lanes 154+366+154	Rhode Island Route 114; Mount Hope Bay	1929	Portsmouth–Bristol; 41°38′23.3″N 71°15′29.7″W	Rhode Island	(Note: The Mount Hope Bridge was listed on the National Register of Historic Places in 1976.)
48	Lewis and Clark Bridge (Columbia River)	366 m (1,200 ft)	830 m (2,725 ft)	Cantilever; Steel; 2 lanes	Washington State Route 433; Columbia River	1930	Longview–Rainier; 46°6′17.1″N 122°57′42.8″W	Washington; Oregon	
49	Sunshine Skyway Bridge	366 m (1,200 ft)	6,700 m (22,000 ft)	Cable-stayed; Concrete box girder deck, concrete pylons 2x2 lanes 165+367+165	Interstate 275; U.S. Route 19; Tampa Bay	1987	St. Petersburg–Terra Ceia; 27°37′13.5″N 82°39′20″W	Florida	
50	William H. Natcher Bridge	366 m (1,200 ft)	1,373 m (4,505 ft)	Cable-stayed; Composite steel/concrete deck, concrete pylons 2x2 lanes 152+366+152	U.S. Route 231; Ohio River	2002	Rockport–Maceo; 37°54′8.8″N 87°2′6.3″W	Indiana; Kentucky	
51	Lewis and Clark Bridge (Ohio River)	366 m (1,201 ft)	762 m (2,500 ft)	Cable-stayed; Composite steel/concrete deck, concrete pylons 2x2 lanes 164+365+164	Interstate 265; Kentucky Route 841; Ohio River	2016	Prospect–Utica; 38°20′33.5″N 85°38′35.4″W	Kentucky; Indiana	
52	Queensboro Bridge	360 m (1,180 ft)	1,135 m (3,724 ft)	Cantilever; 2 levels, steel 4+5 lanes 143+360+192+285 +140	New York State Route 25; East River	1909	New York City; Manhattan–Queens; 40°45′28.3″N 73°57′24.9″W	New York	(Note: Officially named the Ed Koch Queensboro Bridge, it has been designated a New York City landmark in 1967, a National Historic Civil Engineering Landmark in 1972 and listed on the National Register of Historic Places in 1978.)
53	Penobscot Narrows Bridge	354 m (1,161 ft)	646 m (2,119 ft)	Cable-stayed; Concrete box girder deck, concrete pylons 2 lanes 146+354+146	U.S. Route 1 Maine State Route 3 Penobscot River	2006	Prospect–Verona Island; 44°33′35.9″N 68°48′6.2″W	Maine	
54	Ogdensburg–Prescott International Bridge	351 m (1,150 ft)	2,248 m (7,375 ft)	Suspension; Steel truss deck, steel pylons 2 lanes 152+351+152	New York State Route 812; St. Lawrence River	1960	Ogdensburg–Johnstown; 44°44′06.5″N 75°27′33.3″W	New York; Canada	
55	Bill Emerson Memorial Bridge	351 m (1,152 ft)	1,206 m (3,957 ft)	Cable-stayed; Composite steel/concrete deck, concrete pylons 2x2 lanes 143+351+143	Missouri Route 34; Missouri Route 74; Illinois Route 146; Mississippi River	2003	Cape Girardeau–East Cape Girardeau; 37°17′42.7″N 89°31′4.1″W	Missouri; Illinois	
56	Bidwell Bar Bridge	338 m (1,109 ft)	546 m (1,791 ft)	Suspension; Steel truss deck, steel pylons 2 lanes	California State Route 162; Lake Oroville	1965	Oroville; 39°32′59.9″N 121°25′47.9″W	California	
57	Carquinez Bridge; East bridge	335 m (1,099 ft)	1,000 m (3,300 ft)	Cantilever; Steel; 4 lanes 152+335+45+335 +152	Interstate 80; Carquinez Strait	1927; 1958	Vallejo–Crockett; 38°3′39.8″N 122°13′31″W	California	(Note: A first cantilever beam bridge was built in 1927 and doubled in 1958 over the Carquinez Strait, but the oldest was dismantled in 2007 due to its aging and replaced by the Alfred Zampa Memorial Bridge.)
58	Talmadge Memorial Bridge	335 m (1,099 ft)	3,060 m (10,040 ft)	Cable-stayed; Concrete deck, concrete pylons 2x2 lanes	U.S. Route 17; Georgia State Route 404 Spur; Savannah River	1991	Savannah; 32°5′18.4″N 81°5′57″W	Georgia	
59	Hart Bridge	332 m (1,089 ft)	1,171 m (3,842 ft)	Truss; Steel, suspended deck 2x2 lanes	U.S. Route 1 Alternate; Florida State Road 228; St. Johns River	1967	Jacksonville; 30°18′57.6″N 81°37′39.4″W	Florida	
60	Deer Isle Bridge	329 m (1,080 ft)	743 m (2,438 ft)	Suspension; Steel girder deck, steel pylons 2 lanes 147+329+147	Maine State Route 15; Eggemoggin Reach	1939	Sedgwick–Little Deer Isle; 44°17′39.2″N 68°41′19.3″W	Maine	
61	Theodore Roosevelt Lake Bridge	329 m (1,079 ft)	670 m (2,200 ft)	Arch; Steel through arch 2 lanes	Arizona State Route 188; Theodore Roosevelt Lake	1990	Gila County–Maricopa County; 33°40′26″N 111°9′25.1″W	Arizona	
62	Richmond–San Rafael Bridge	326 m (1,070 ft) (x2)	8,851 m (29,039 ft)	Cantilever; 2 levels, steel 2+3 lanes 2x(164+326+164)	Interstate 580; San Francisco Bay	1956	San Rafael–Richmond; 37°56′1.9″N 122°25′37.3″W	California	
63	Simon Kenton Memorial Bridge	323 m (1,060 ft)	607 m (1,991 ft)	Suspension; Steel girder deck, steel pylons 2 lanes 142+323+142	U.S. Route 62; U.S. Route 68; Ohio State Route 41; Ohio River	1932	Maysville–Aberdeen; 38°38′59.5″N 83°45′34.5″W	Kentucky; Ohio	
64	Mike O'Callaghan–Pat Tillman Memorial Bridge	323 m (1,060 ft)	579 m (1,900 ft)	Arch; Concrete deck arch 2x2 lanes	Interstate 11; U.S. Route 93; Colorado River	2010	Clark County–Mohave County; 36°0′44.8″N 114°44′29.4″W	Nevada; Arizona	
65	John A. Roebling Suspension Bridge	322 m (1,056 ft)	686 m (2,251 ft)	Suspension with cable-stays Steel truss deck, masonry pylons 2 lanes 89+322+90	Kentucky Route 17; Ohio River	1866	Cincinnati–Covington; 39°5′34.3″N 84°30′35.3″W	Ohio; Kentucky	(Note: The John A. Roebling Suspension Bridge held the record of the longest span in the world from 1866 to 1869. It was listed on the National Register of Historic Places in 1975.)
66	Dent Bridge	320 m (1,050 ft)	472 m (1,549 ft)	Suspension; Steel girder deck, steel pylons 2 lanes	Dent Bridge Road; Clearwater River; Dworshak Dam Reservoir	1971	Clearwater County; 46°36′9.2″N 116°10′42.2″W	Idaho	
67	William H. Harsha Bridge	320 m (1,050 ft)	710 m (2,330 ft)	Cable-stayed; Composite steel/concrete deck, concrete pylons 2 lanes 38+122+320+122+38	U.S. Route 62; U.S. Route 68; Ohio State Route 41; Ohio River	2000	Maysville–Aberdeen; 38°41′4.5″N 83°46′54.7″W	Kentucky; Ohio	
68	Glen Canyon Dam Bridge	313 m (1,027 ft)	387 m (1,270 ft)	Arch; Steel deck arch 2 lanes	U.S. Route 89; Colorado River	1959	Coconino County; 36°56′8.5″N 111°28′59.8″W	Arizona	
69	Wheeling Suspension Bridge	308 m (1,010 ft)	308 m (1,010 ft)	Suspension with cable-stays Steel truss deck, masonry pylons	Footbridge; Ohio River	1849	Wheeling; 40°4′12.9″N 80°43′35.1″W	West Virginia	(Note: The Wheeling Suspension Bridge was the first bridge with a span of more than 1,000 feet (300 m) and the longest span in the world from 1849 until 1866. Listed on the National Register of Historic Places in 1973, it was closed to automobile traffic in September 2019.)
70	Lewiston–Queenston Bridge	305 m (1,000 ft)	488 m (1,601 ft)	Arch; Steel deck arch 5 lanes	Interstate 190; Niagara River	1962	Lewiston–Queenston; 43°09′11.2″N 79°02′40.5″W	New York; Canada	
71	Newburgh–Beacon Bridge	305 m (1,000 ft)	2,394 m (7,854 ft)	Cantilever; Steel; Twin bridges 2x3 lanes 183+305+183	Interstate 84; New York State Route 52; Hudson River	1963; 1980	Newburgh–Beacon; 41°31′12.1″N 74°0′0.1″W	New York	
72	Long Beach International Gateway	305 m (1,000 ft)	2,682 m (8,799 ft)	Cable-stayed; Composite steel/concrete deck, concrete pylons 2x3 lanes 152+305+152	Interstate 710; Back Channel, Port of Long Beach	2020	Long Beach–Terminal Island; 33°45′53.8″N 118°13′16.4″W	California	
73	Hell Gate Bridge	303 m (995 ft)	5,182 m (17,001 ft)	Arch; Steel through arch 3 railway tracks	Amtrak Northeast Corridor; CSX Y102; P&W FPCH; CHFP freight trains East River; Hell Gate	1917	New York City; The Bronx–Queens; 40°46′56.6″N 73°55′18.4″W	New York	
74	Perrine Bridge	303 m (994 ft)	457 m (1,499 ft)	Arch; Steel deck arch 2x2 lanes	U.S. Route 93; Snake River	1974	Twin Falls; 42°36′2.9″N 114°27′12.6″W	Idaho	

== Former major bridges ==
This table presents a non-exhaustive list of the former road and railway bridges with spans greater than 300 metres (984 ft).

	Name	Span	Length	Type	Carries Crosses	Opened	Location	State	Ref.
1	Tacoma Narrows Bridge (1940) collapsed in 1940	853 m (2,800 ft)	1,810 m (5,940 ft)	Suspension; Steel girder deck, steel pylons 2 lanes 335+853+335	Washington State Route 16; Puget Sound	1940	Tacoma; 47°16′0″N 122°33′0″W	Washington	
2	San Francisco–Oakland Bay Bridge; East bridge dismantled in 2014	427 m (1,401 ft)	3,102 m (10,177 ft)	Cantilever; Steel; 2 levels 2x5 lanes 155+427+156	Interstate 80; San Francisco Bay	1936	San Francisco–Oakland; 37°48′54.4″N 122°21′23.5″W	California	
3	First Niagara Clifton Bridge destroyed by storm in 1889	386 m (1,266 ft)		Suspension with cable-stays Wooden deck and pylons	Road bridge Niagara River	1869	Niagara Falls, New York–Niagara Falls, Ontario; 43°05′18.2″N 79°04′11.3″W	New York	(Note: The First Niagara Clifton Bridge was the longest span in the world from 1869 until 1883. The covering of the towers was carried out in 1872, in 1884, the wooden towers were replaced with steel, finally all the wooden components were replaced with steel in 1888 and the deck was widened. The bridge can then have very different appearances depending on the year.)
4	Tappan Zee Bridge (1955–2017) dismantled in 2017	369 m (1,211 ft)	4,881 m (16,014 ft)	Cantilever; Steel; 3+4 lanes 183+369+183	Interstate 87; Interstate 287; New York State Thruway; Hudson River	1955	Tarrytown–South Nyack; 41°4′12.3″N 73°52′51.9″W	New York	
5	Francis Scott Key Bridge (Baltimore) collapsed in 2024	366 m (1,200 ft)	2,632 m (8,635 ft)	Truss; Steel, suspended deck 2x2 lanes	Interstate 695; Baltimore Beltway; Patapsco River	1977	Baltimore; 39°13′1″N 76°31′41.5″W	Maryland	
6	John P. Grace Memorial Bridge dismantled in 2005	320 m (1,050 ft)	4,300 m (14,100 ft)	Cantilever; Steel; 2 lanes 137+320+137	U.S. Route 17; Cooper River	1929	Charleston–Mount Pleasant; 32°48′14.0″N 79°54′49.0″W	South Carolina	

== See also ==
Other lists of U.S. bridges

- By height
- By state
- By city
  - Boston
  - New York City
  - Pittsburgh
  - Portland, Maine
  - Portland, Oregon
  - Seattle
- Cable-stayed bridges
- Covered bridges
- List of toll bridges § United States
- Category:Lists of bridges documented by the Historic American Engineering Record
- Category:Lists of bridges on the National Register of Historic Places
- Category:Lists of river crossings in the United States

Other topics

- Transport in the United States
- Rail transportation in the United States
- High-speed rail in the United States
- Commuter rail in North America
- Numbered highways in the United States
- Geography of the United States
- National Bridge Inventory

== Notes and references ==
- Notes
