= Interstate 310 =

Interstate Highway in Louisiana

Interstate 310
- I-310 highlighted in red

Route information
- Auxiliary route of I-10
- Maintained by Louisiana DOTD
- Length: 11.709 mi (18.844 km)
- Existed: 1983–present
- History: I-310 planned in 1977 and opened in stages between 1983 and 1993.
- NHS: Entire route

Major junctions
- South end: Future I-49 / US 90 / LA 3127 in Boutte
- US 61 in St. Rose
- North end: I-10 west of Kenner

Location
- Country: United States
- State: Louisiana
- Parishes: St. Charles

Highway system
- Interstate Highway System; Main; Auxiliary; Suffixed; Business; Future; Louisiana State Highway System; Interstate; US; State; Scenic
| ← LA 309 | → LA 310 |

Interstate 310 (I-310) is a short spur route of I-10 west of New Orleans, located entirely in St. Charles Parish, Louisiana. It begins at a point on I-10 just west of Louis Armstrong New Orleans International Airport and the city of Kenner. It travels southward as an elevated freeway across the LaBranche Wetlands and intersects U.S. Route 61 (US 61) in St. Rose. The highway crosses the Mississippi River from Destrehan to Luling via the Hale Boggs Memorial Bridge. After a brief concurrency with Louisiana Highway 3127 (LA 3127), I-310 terminates at US 90 in Boutte.

== Route description ==
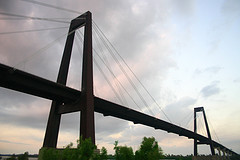
Hale Boggs Memorial Bridge—Part of I-310, November 2006

I-310's southern terminus is at US 90, where it travels north through flat marshlands. The southernmost mile (1.6 km) was originally built as part of LA 3127, an inland bypass to LA 18, and is cosigned with I-310. North of I-310's first interchange, LA 3127 leaves the Interstate, as I-310 heads towards the Mississippi River. After the next interchange, LA 18, I-310 crosses the Mississippi River via the Hale Boggs Memorial Bridge (Luling–Destrehan Bridge), a cable-stayed bridge connecting the towns of Luling and Destrehan.

North of the bridge, there is an interchange with LA 48. I-310 then proceeds to the LaBranche Wetlands Bridge, a five-mile (8.0 km) bridge over environmentally sensitive wetlands between Destrehan and the I-10 interchange. The northernmost two miles (3.2 km) of this bridge between the US 61 and I-10 interchanges was constructed using a method known as "end-on construction". This is a top–down technique in which construction platforms are mounted on concrete piles to avoid disrupting the environment below. From these platforms, the next set of piles and bridge viaducts are placed, allowing the platform to progress forward for the next set. The interstate terminates at I-10 just west of Kenner.

== History ==
I-310 was originally planned, along with I-510, as part of Interstate 410, a southern beltway around the New Orleans metro area. In 1977, I-410 was canceled and the two Interstates were split into their current components. The Hale Boggs Memorial Bridge was completed in October 1983 and was the first portion of I-310 to open. The west bank approach, extending to US 90 in Boutte was opened in March 1988, followed in July 1991 by the east bank approach as far as US 61. I-310 was completed on May 7, 1993 when the final section between US 61 and I-10, including much of the LaBranche Wetlands Bridge, was opened to traffic.

== Future ==
Future plans for I-310 are to extend the interstate to connect with the future extension of I-49 from Lafayette to New Orleans. Another proposal in the Louisiana Statewide Transportation Plan proposes an extension of the Earhart Expressway (Louisiana Highway 3139) westward from Dickory Avenue to I-310, to serve as a freeway alternative to I-10.

== Exit list ==
The entire highway is in St. Charles Parish.

| Location | mi | km | Exit | Destinations | Notes |
|---|---|---|---|---|---|
| Boutte | 11.705– 11.445 | 18.837– 18.419 | | US 90 / LA 3127 – Boutte, New Orleans, Houma | Southern terminus of I-310 / LA 3127 |
| Luling | 10.813– 9.579 | 17.402– 15.416 | 10 | LA 3127 north – Donaldsonville | North end of LA 3127 concurrency |
| Luling | 8.457– 7.743 | 13.610– 12.461 | 7 | LA 18 – Luling, Hahnville | |
| Mississippi River | 8.242– 6.144 | 13.264– 9.888 | Hale Boggs Memorial Bridge | | |
| Destrehan | 6.765– 6.286 | 10.887– 10.116 | 6 | LA 48 – Destrehan, St. Rose | |
| Destrehan | 5.379 | 8.657 | South end of LaBranche Wetlands Bridge | | |
| St. Rose | 3.583– 2.367 | 5.766– 3.809 | 2 | US 61 – Kenner, Norco | US 61 is Airline Highway (not signed here) |
| | 0.620– 0.000 | 0.998– 0.000 | 1-1A | I-10 – New Orleans, Baton Rouge | Northern terminus; signed as exits 1 (west) and 1A (east); exit 220 on I-10 |
| | 0.000 | 0.000 | North end of LaBranche Wetlands Bridge | | |
1.000 mi = 1.609 km; 1.000 km = 0.621 mi: Concurrency terminus

== See also ==
- List of auxiliary Interstate Highways
- List of Interstate Highways in Louisiana
