= Gary Smith Jr. =

American politician and attorney

Gary Smith

Member of the Louisiana Senate from the 19th district
- In office January 2012 – January 2024
- Preceded by: Joel Chaisson
- Succeeded by: Gregory A. Miller

Personal details
- Born: August 27, 1972 (age 53) Norco, Louisiana, U.S.
- Party: Democratic
- Spouse: Katherine Smith
- Education: Louisiana State University (BBA); Loyola University New Orleans (JD); Tulane University (LLM)
- Website: State Senate website

Gary L. Smith Jr. (born August 27, 1972), is an American attorney from his native Norco in St. Charles Parish, Louisiana, who is a former Democratic member of the Louisiana State Senate for District 19, a position which he held from 2012 to 2024.

He succeeded the term-limited Democratic Senator Joel T. Chaisson, II.

== Personal life and education ==
Smith graduated in 1990 from Destrehan High School in Destrehan in St. Charles Parish. In 1994, he earned a Bachelor of Business Administration degree from Louisiana State University in Baton Rouge. He earned his Juris Doctor from Loyola University New Orleans College of Law in 1998 and an LLM from Tulane Law School in 1999. He is married to Katherine Mosley, the granddaughter of U.S. Senator Russell Long and the great-granddaughter of Louisiana Governor Huey Long.

== Career ==
Smith interned for Senator John Breaux and Congressman Billy Tauzin. Smith was elected to the Louisiana House of Representatives in 2000, and to the Louisiana State Senate in 2012.
