= Beth Anne Billings =

American politician

Beth Billings

Member of the Louisiana House of Representatives from the 56th district
- Incumbent
- Assumed office January 8, 2024
- Preceded by: Gregory Miller

Personal details
- Party: Republican

Beth Anne Billings is an American politician serving as a member of the Louisiana House of Representatives from the 56th district. A member of the Republican Party, Billings has been in office since January 8, 2024 after running unopposed.
