= James Brown Humphrey =

American grandfather of jazz

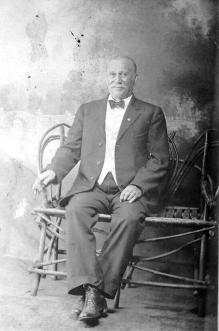
James Brown Humphrey

James Brown Humphrey, also known as "Professor Jim" Humphrey (1859–1937) was an American classical musician, dance band leader, and music instructor in New Orleans, Louisiana, and central figure in the formation of jazz as a contemporary musical art form. Humphrey predates the jazz genre as an active performer and is not himself considered a jazz musician. However, his involvement in the formal training of large numbers of musicians along the southern plantation belt of the Mississippi River delta during the immediate years following the reconstruction era resulted in many virtuoso performers who would go on to originate jazz as a distinct musical genre. Consequently, he is regarded by some in the jazz aficionado community to be "the grandfather of jazz".

== Early life ==
Humphrey was born on the Cornland plantation in Sellers, Louisiana, a former town northwest of New Orleans in St. Charles Parish that is now part of Norco, Louisiana. The son of a slaveholder and a slave, he was sent away by his father to live with a free black family. Although exiled from his original birthplace, his father continued to support him financially. This support included a monetary allocation for music lessons. Due to this exposure, Humphrey became a proficient classically trained musician.

== Career ==
In adulthood, Humphrey would go on to find work as classical musician, playing cornet in the Bloom Philharmonic Orchestra in New Orleans. He also performed in the Pelican Brass Band, most often playing trumpet.

As a music teacher, he would travel the plantation belt, usually by train, organizing brass bands on the plantations along the Mississippi River. Visiting weekly, he would schedule brass band rehearsals at each location, often sleeping overnight before moving on to the next location. Humphrey also taught at New Orleans University on Saturdays.

Humphrey's clientele on the plantations was primarily composed of field laborers. From the 1880s to around 1915, many large slave-era plantations along the Mississippi River delta still existed; only now with African-American laborers as paid field hands. There was heavy labor competition at the time. At many of the plantations on which Humphrey offered his services as a music instructor, he was contracted by plantation owners to do so as an added incentive to lure the most eligible laborers.

One such arrangement was with Henry C. Warmoth, a former reconstruction era carpetbagger governor of Louisiana and one of the foremost sugar planters and manufacturers of his day. At the close of reconstruction, Warmoth, who was an advocate for black rights and a former Union Army officer, remained in the south and acquired the Magnolia Plantation, a large sugar producing farm about thirty miles down the Mississippi River from New Orleans. Warmoth maintained a number of brass bands populated with African-American musicians and was a benefactor to many local performers. A key element of this involvement was the contracting of Professor Humphrey's services in training these musicians.

Humphrey also taught at other plantations including Deer Range, St. Sophie, Ironton, Belair, Jesuits Bend, and Oakville, all within 25 miles of land along both banks of the Mississippi River. Humphrey not only had influence on the individual musicians in New Orleans, but also the dance orchestras of the city. Many of his pupils went on to become the core group of working musicians of the city. In many cases Humphrey was paid directly by individual students. Although the majority of these students were African-American, he also trained a number of white clients as well.

Humphrey was adept at playing all brass band and string instruments and initially taught classical music to his students. However, the brass band movement was at its height of popularity during the turn of the century and the bands of such prolific bandleaders as John Philip Sousa and Patrick Gilmore were enjoying great popularity in performing marches, quadrilles, and the craze of the day, ragtime. New Orleans, was quickly becoming a haven for brass bands, probably having more per capita than any other city in the United States. Professor Humphrey is widely acclaimed to be instrumental in training the large field of skilled musicians that would fill the ensuing boom.

In addition to his work on the plantations, which continued for decades, he taught in various towns in Louisiana and the neighboring state of Mississippi. At his home in New Orleans he organized several prominent bands such as The Onward Band and the Pickwick. Humphrey lead, taught music within, and performed in brass bands, dance bands, and classical orchestras. He also composed and arranged music for his bands and created melodies for his pupils.

One key element to his early involvement in jazz lay in his teaching curriculum. Humphrey, known as a tough taskmaster, would write syncopated rhythms as exercises for his students. The nature of these rhythms became characteristic of early jazz phrasing, as his young students were fond of the rhythmic style they reflected. This training developed in many early jazz musicians a concept of syncopated phrasing—something that did not appear in the music of the march or even ragtime. But when added to ragtime, the associated style of syncopation was an early manifestation of what was eventually termed ‘swinging’ a piece of music.

== Notable students ==
The list of his notable students includes such prominent early jazz greats as Chris Kelly, Sam Morgan, Sunny Henry, Harrison Barnes, Jimmy "Kid" Clayton, Tubby Hall, Kid Ory, Jim Robinson, and John Casimir.

Humphrey's musical abilities also indirectly influenced many of the New Orleans jazz greats that he did not teach directly. One such musician was Louis Armstrong, of whom he was an acquaintance. John Casimir, one of Humphrey's longtime students, and eventual bandmate of Louis Armstrong's, recalled in an interview:

On Tulane Avenue, Louis Armstrong used to come around all the time. And Professor Humphrey used to show me how to make C#. Louis sneaked around there and asked, ‘How you make that C# and B natural?’ Professor Humphrey come round there one day and caught me showin’ Louis. I be payin’ for it and I was givin’ it to the other fellow.

== Musical family ==
Humphrey helped to found two musical dynasties; that of his students and that of his descendants. He was the father of Willie Eli Humphrey Sr., the clarinetist, and of Lillian and Jamesetta, bass players. Early in the century, Lillian played bass in the 20 piece Bloom Philharmonic Orchestra in New Orleans.

He was the grandfather of Percy Humphrey, trumpet, and Willie Humphrey Jr., clarinet, both early members of the world-renowned Preservation Hall Jazz Band. Professor Humphrey was also grandfather to their sibling Earl Humphrey, a trombonist, as well as famed jazz trumpeter Umar Sharif (formerly Emery Thompson).

Willie Humphrey Jr. once recalled in an interview, "He had his system -- he branded us if we didn’t do right, he would put it, well, we could better understand on our backs," he chuckled fondly.

== Late career ==
Humphrey remained active as a performer, band leader, and music teacher well into his autumn years before dying in 1937. Despite his talent and high reputation, Humphrey, like most black musicians of his time, was unable to make a good living through music alone. Humphrey had several non-musical sources of income. At one time he had a job turning gaslights on and off on Canal Street, the main business street which divided the old French Quarter from the newer Uptown section. He sold flags from his garden, and made money in real estate.
