= Mary M. Bethune High School (Norco, Louisiana) =

Location
- Norco, Louisiana; United States
- Coordinates: 30.003753°N 90.410824°W

Information
- School type: Public
- School district: St. Charles Parish Public School System
- Grades: 1-12
- Gender: Co-Ed
- Campus type: Suburban
- Mascot: Bulldogs

Mary M. Bethune High School was a public high school located in present-day Norco, Louisiana in St. Charles Parish, Louisiana. It served black students on the east bank of the Mississippi River, from grades 1 through 12. It was in the St. Charles Parish Public School System. The school mascot was the Bulldogs.

== History ==
Mary M. Bethune High School was an elementary and secondary racially segregated school located in the Diamond Community of Norco, Louisiana that opened in 1952. In 1969, the school was closed with elementary-aged children attending schools directed by court guidelines and high school students moved to the neighbouring Destrehan High School.

== See also ==
- List of former high schools in Louisiana
- G.W. Carver High School
