= G. W. Carver High School (Hahnville, Louisiana) =

Location
- Hahnville, Louisiana; United States
- Coordinates: 29.967081°N 90.410129°W

Information
- School type: Public
- School district: St. Charles Parish Public School System
- Grades: 1-12
- Gender: Co-Ed
- Campus type: Suburban
- Mascot: Tigers

G. W. Carver High School was a public high school located in Hahnville, Louisiana in St. Charles Parish, Louisiana, United States. It served black students on the west bank of the Mississippi River. It was in the St. Charles Parish Public School System. The school mascot was the Tigers.

== History ==
G. W. Carver High School was a secondary racially segregated school located in Hahnville, Louisiana that opened in 1952. After the school closed in 1969, its students were moved to Hahnville High School.

== See also ==
- List of former high schools in Louisiana
- Mary M. Bethune High School
