= Hale Boggs Memorial Bridge =

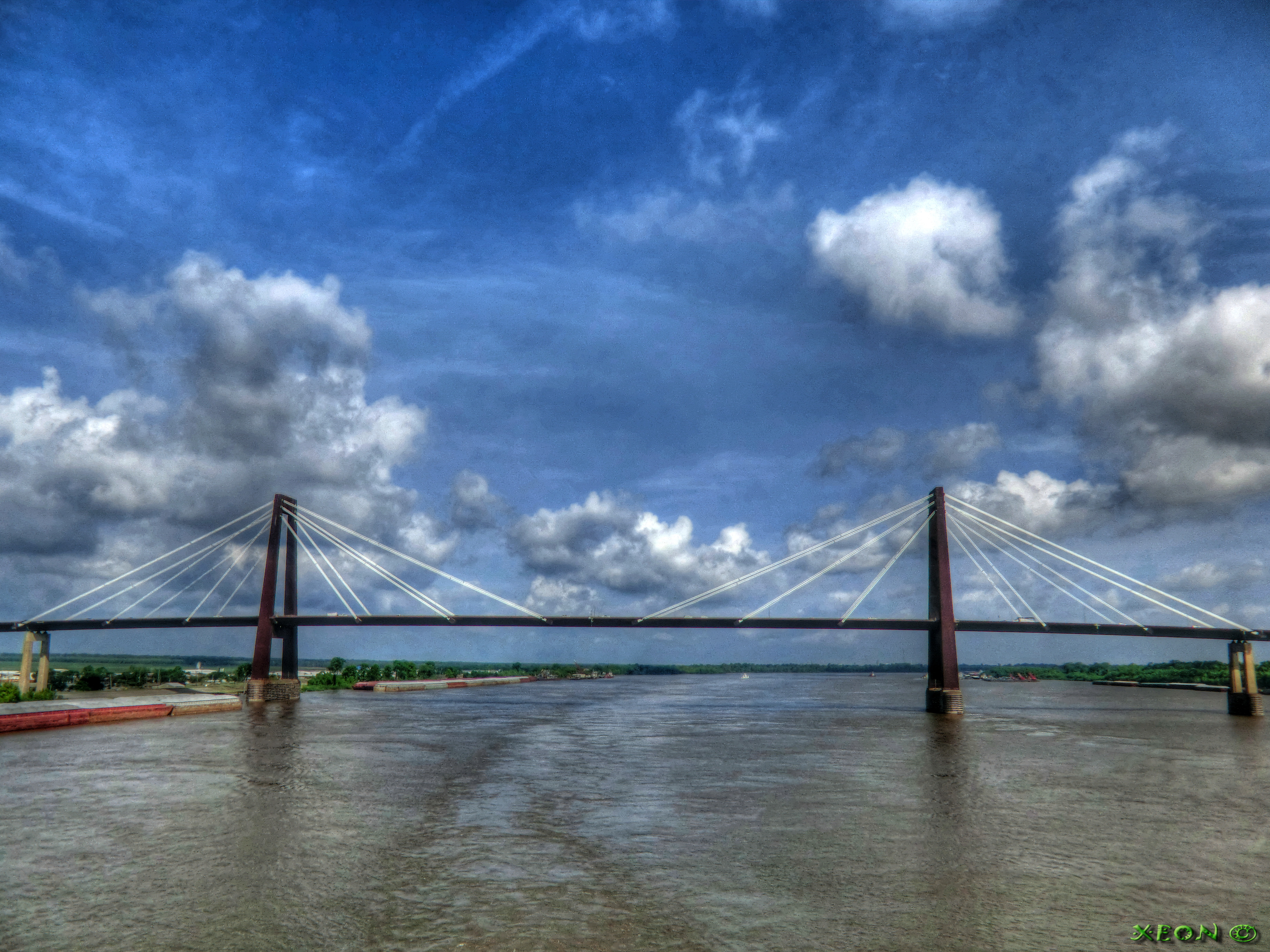
- Coordinates: 29°56′33″N 90°22′25″W
- Carries: 4 lanes of I-310
- Crosses: Mississippi River
- Locale: Destrehan, Louisiana and Luling, Louisiana
- Official name: Hale Boggs Memorial Bridge
- Other name: Luling Bridge
- Maintained by: LA DOTD
- ID number: 024504503700001

Characteristics
- Design: Cable-stayed bridge
- Total length: 10,700 feet (3,261 m)
- Width: 76 feet (23 m)
- Longest span: 1,220 feet (372 m)
- Clearance below: 158 feet (48 m)

History
- Opened: October 6, 1983

Statistics
- Daily traffic: 40,000 (2008)

Location
- Interactive map of Hale Boggs Memorial Bridge

The Hale Boggs Memorial Bridge (also known as the Luling Bridge) is a cable-stayed bridge over the Mississippi River in St. Charles Parish, Louisiana. It is named for the late United States Congressman Hale Boggs.

With a total length of 10,699 feet (3,261 m; 2.0263 mi), it is one of the longest bridges in the world.

== History ==
The bridge originally named the Luling–Destrehan Bridge, was dedicated by Governor David C. Treen and Bishop Stanley Ott of Baton Rouge and opened to traffic on October 6, 1983 connecting Louisiana Highway 18 on the West Bank and Louisiana Highway 48 on the East Bank. The dedication even featured a Louisiana political stunt. During Governor David Treen's address, an airplane flew over the site with a trailing banner emblazoned with "Edwards Did It," a nod to the fact that much of the bridge's construction took place during the terms of 4-time Louisiana Governor, Edwin W. Edwards, who was in the midst of a successful campaign to regain the governor's office from Treen.

The Hale Boggs Bridge was the third major cable-stayed bridge in the United States after the 1,255-foot John O'Connell Bridge of Sitka, Alaska (the United States' first vehicular cable-stayed girder spanned bridge) and the Pasco-Kennewick Bridge or Ed Hendler Bridge in Washington. The Hale Boggs Bridge was the first cable-stayed bridge to be built across the Mississippi River. In 1993, it was incorporated into the newly completed Interstate 310, making it the first cable-stayed bridge in the Interstate Highway System. Upon completion of Interstate 49, I-310 and the Hale Boggs Bridge will serve as a connection between I-49 and Interstate 10 on the western edge of metropolitan New Orleans.

== Design ==
The superstructure and West approaches of the Hale Boggs Bridge were designed by the prime consultant, Frankland and Leinhard of New York, NY (E. Stanley Jarosz, Vice-president & Chief Engineer, & Myron Lepkaluk, President). The James F. Lincoln Arc Welding Foundation recognized Jarosz's and Frankland & Leinhard's design achievement with a major award in the year the bridge was completed. The foundations of the main span and the East approaches were designed by Modjeski and Masters of Harrisburg, PA. The original construction was by a team headed by Williams Brothers Construction Co, Inc.

The Hale Boggs's design features an unpainted weathering steel towers and superstructure, an orthotropic steel box girder superstructure, and two planes of cables in a fan pattern. Weathering steel exhibits uniform oxidation or "rusting" that results in a uniform protective patina and reduces maintenance requirements. The bridge's weathered bronze color is intended to blend with the muddy waters of the Mississippi River.

The prefabricated cables, the Swiss manufacturer of which was selected by Williams Brothers Construction Co., Inc. featured a heavy polyethylene sheathing that began cracking even before installation, leading to moisture intrusion and cable deterioration. There were additional problems with rust and water leakage in the anchorages. A project to replace the cables began in the summer of 2009.

== MV George Prince ferry disaster ==
The bridge was under construction on October 20, 1976 when the Luling–Destrehan Ferry, M/V George Prince, was struck by the tanker SS Frosta while crossing the river from Destrehan to Luling; the same communities connected by this bridge. Seventy-three passengers and five crew members perished when the ferry capsized; only eighteen survived. It was later revealed all five crew members, including pilot Egidio "Gene" Auletta Sr., were impaired to varying degrees by alcohol consumption. There is a memorial on the East Bank in Destrehan to honor all the people who died in the disaster.

== Events ==
The United Way of St. Charles hosts its annual 5K/10K Bridge Run over the Hale Boggs Bridge each Spring. Runners & walkers begin on the East Bank of the Mississippi River and finish at the West Bank Bridge Park. 2013's event was held on April 6, 2013.

The United Way of St. Charles also hosts its annual "Battle For The Paddle", a jambalaya & gumbo cookoff, each Fall. This event is held under the Hale Boggs Bridge at the West Bank Bridge Park.

== Gallery ==
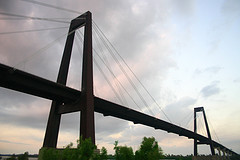
Hale Boggs Memorial Bridge

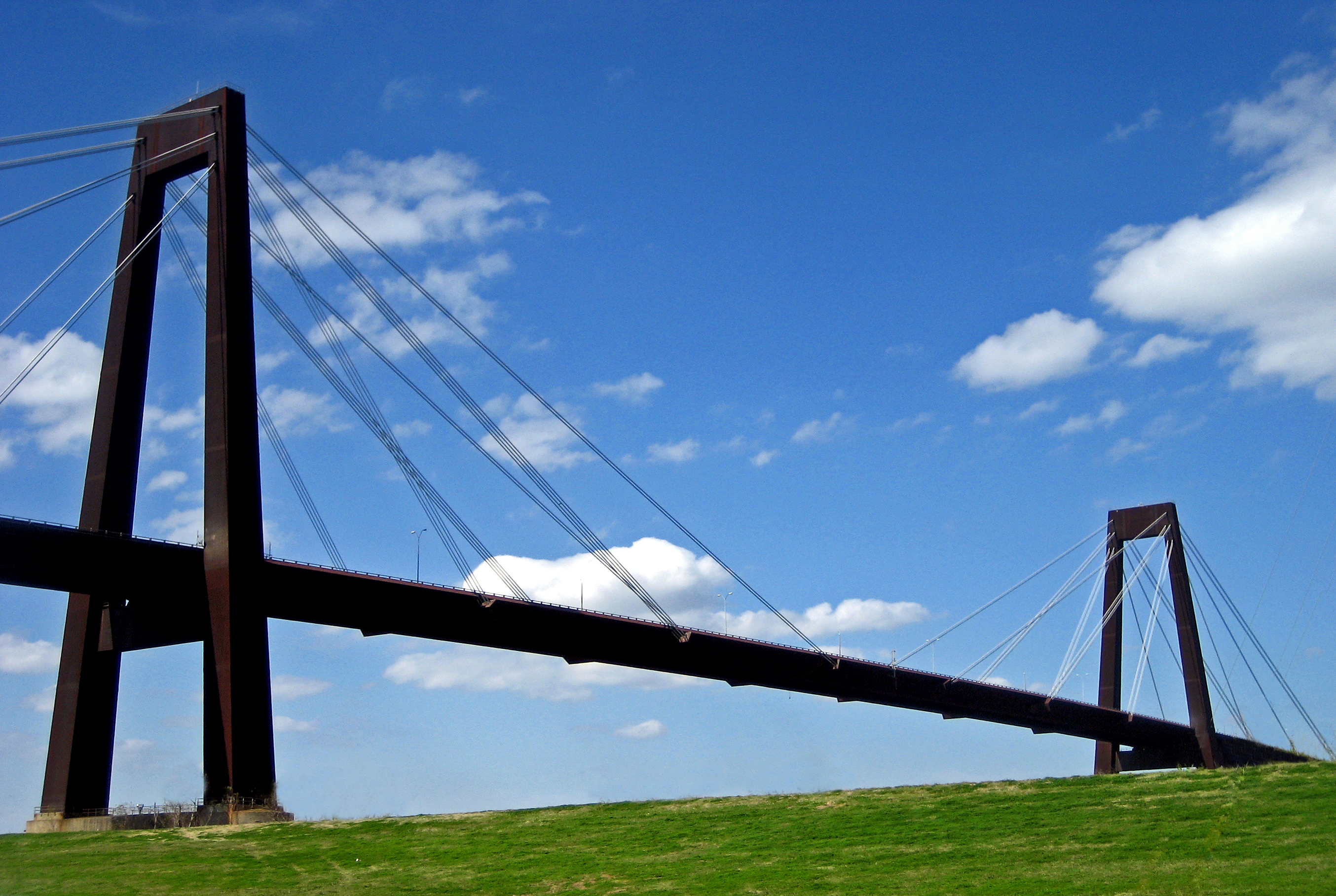
Hale Boggs Memorial Bridge-Daytime

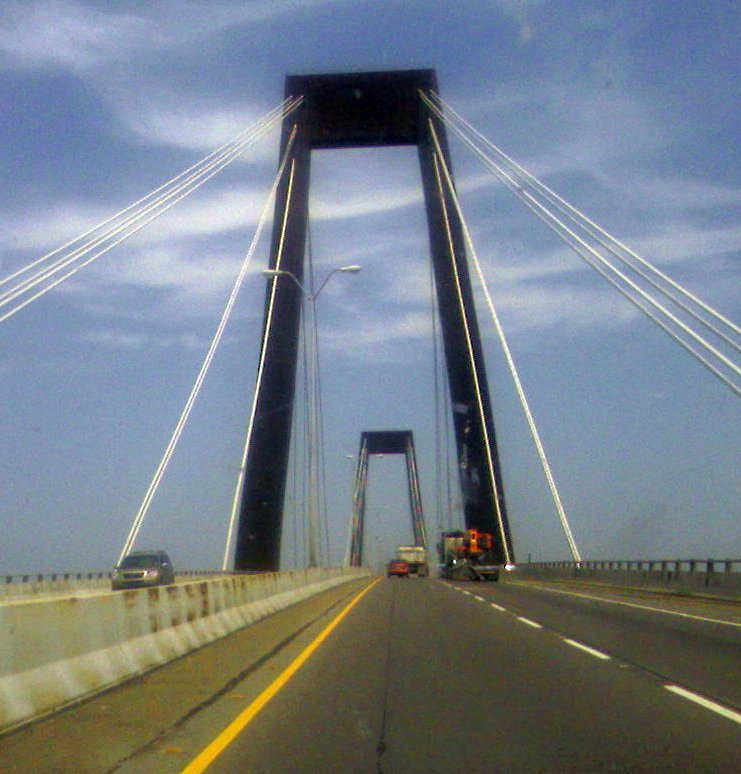
Crossing the Hale Boggs Memorial Bridge

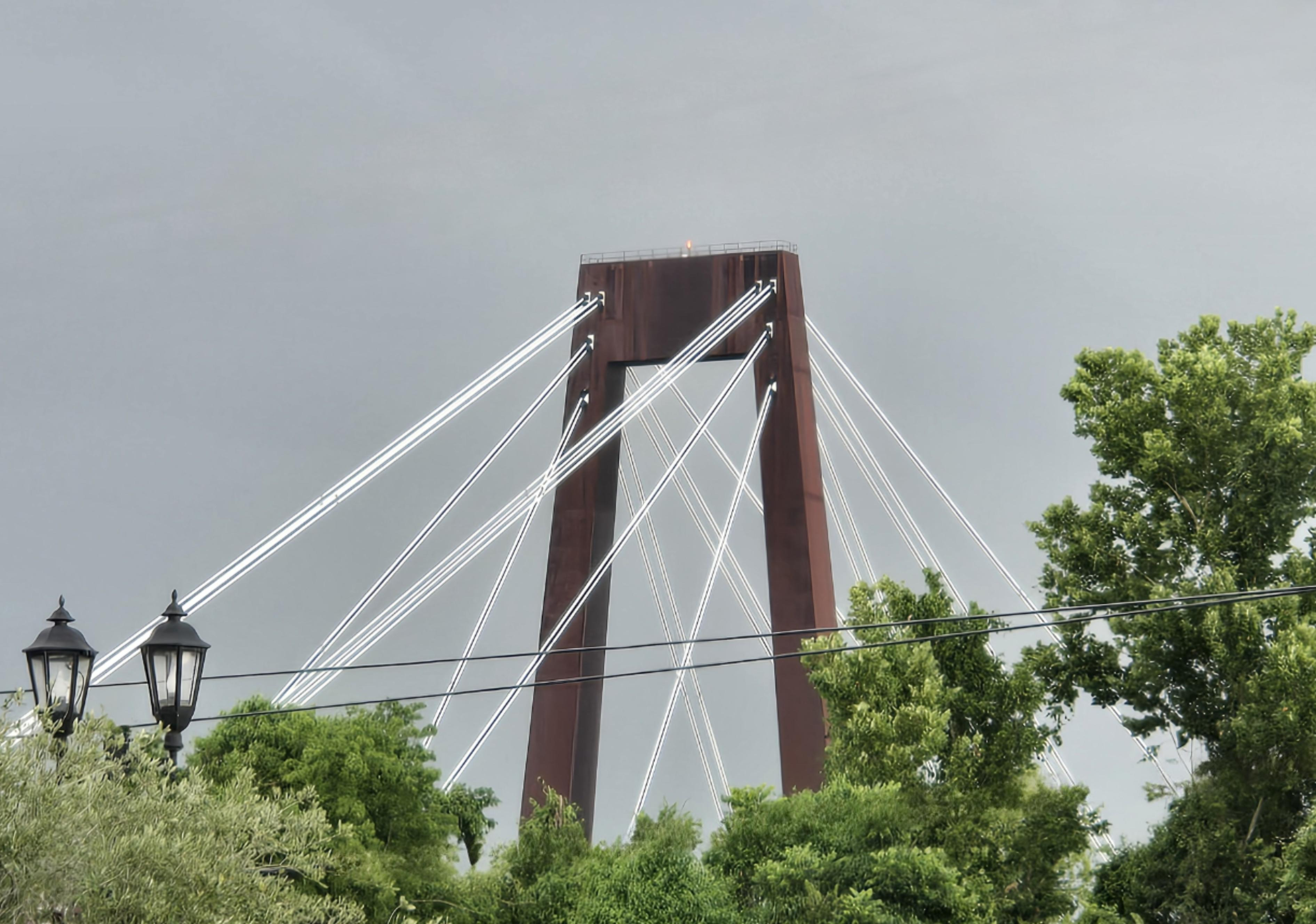
Hale Boggs Memorial Bridge, Steel Pylon and Stay Cables

== See also ==
- List of bridges in the United States
- List of crossings of the Lower Mississippi River
- List of longest bridges
