= Ralph R. Miller =

American politician (1934–2017)

Member of the Louisiana House of Representatives
- In office 1968–1980
- In office 1982–1992

Personal details
- Born: April 27, 1934
- Died: March 30, 2017 (aged 82)
- Party: Democratic
- Children: Gregory A. Miller

Ralph R. Miller (April 27, 1934 – March 30, 2017) was an American politician. A member of the Democratic Party, he served in the Louisiana House of Representatives from 1968 to 1980 and again from 1982 to 1992.

Miller died on March 30, 2017, at the age of 82.
