= St. Charles Parish Public School System =

Public school system in Louisiana, USA

St. Charles Parish Public Schools
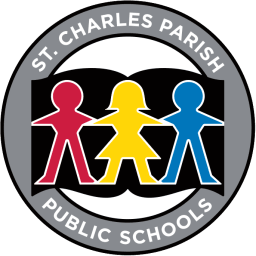

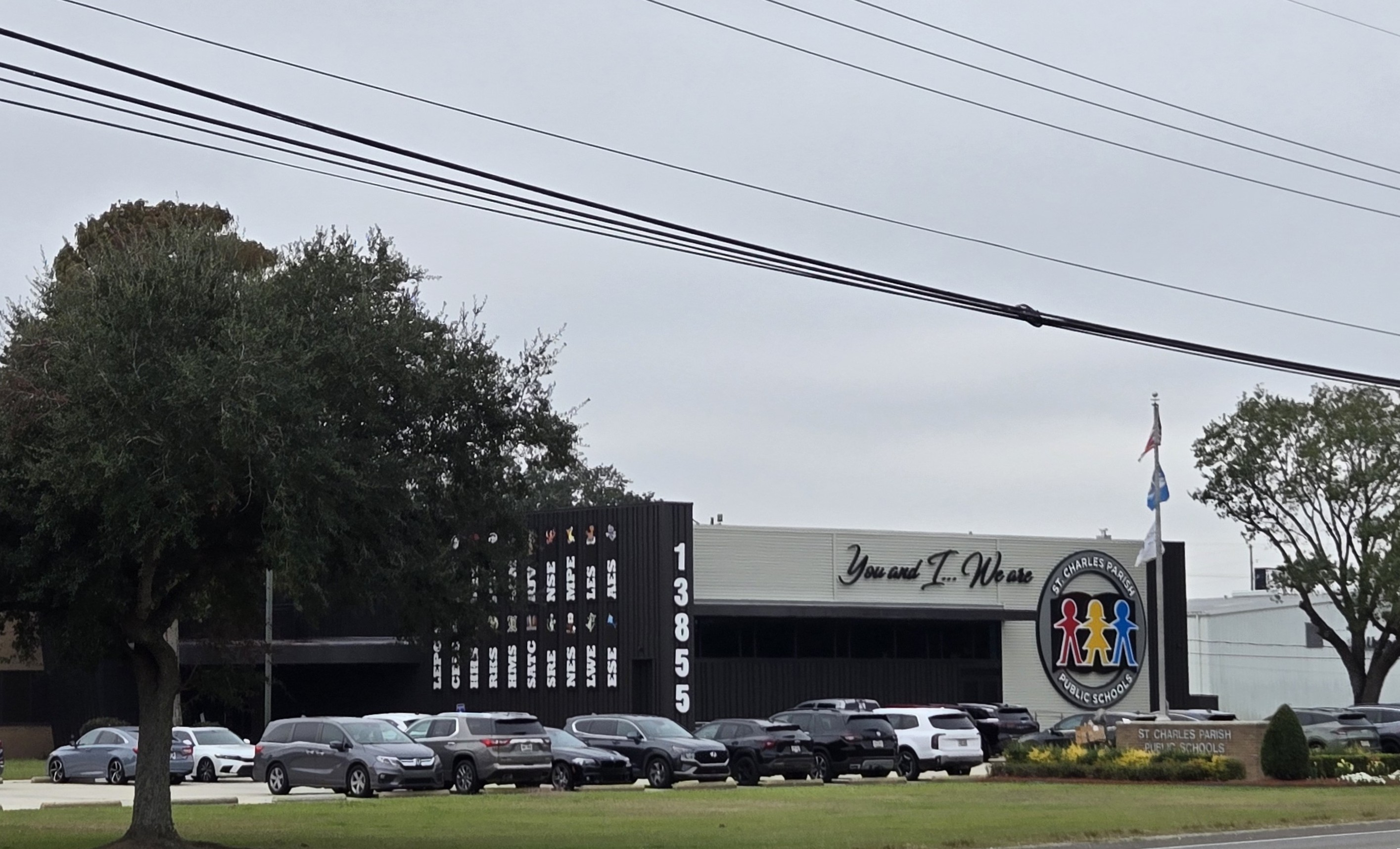
- St. Charles Parish School Board Central Office

Address
- 13855 River Rd. Luling, Louisiana, 70070; United States
- Coordinates: 29.938732°N 90.3799582°W

District information
- Grades: PK-12

Other information
- Website: www.wearescpps.org

The St. Charles Parish Public School System is a public school district headquartered in Luling, Louisiana. It serves all of St. Charles Parish.

== Schools ==
Note: There are no incorporated places in St. Charles Parish. The communities listed in italics after each school are unincorporated census-designated places (CDPs).

=== High schools ===
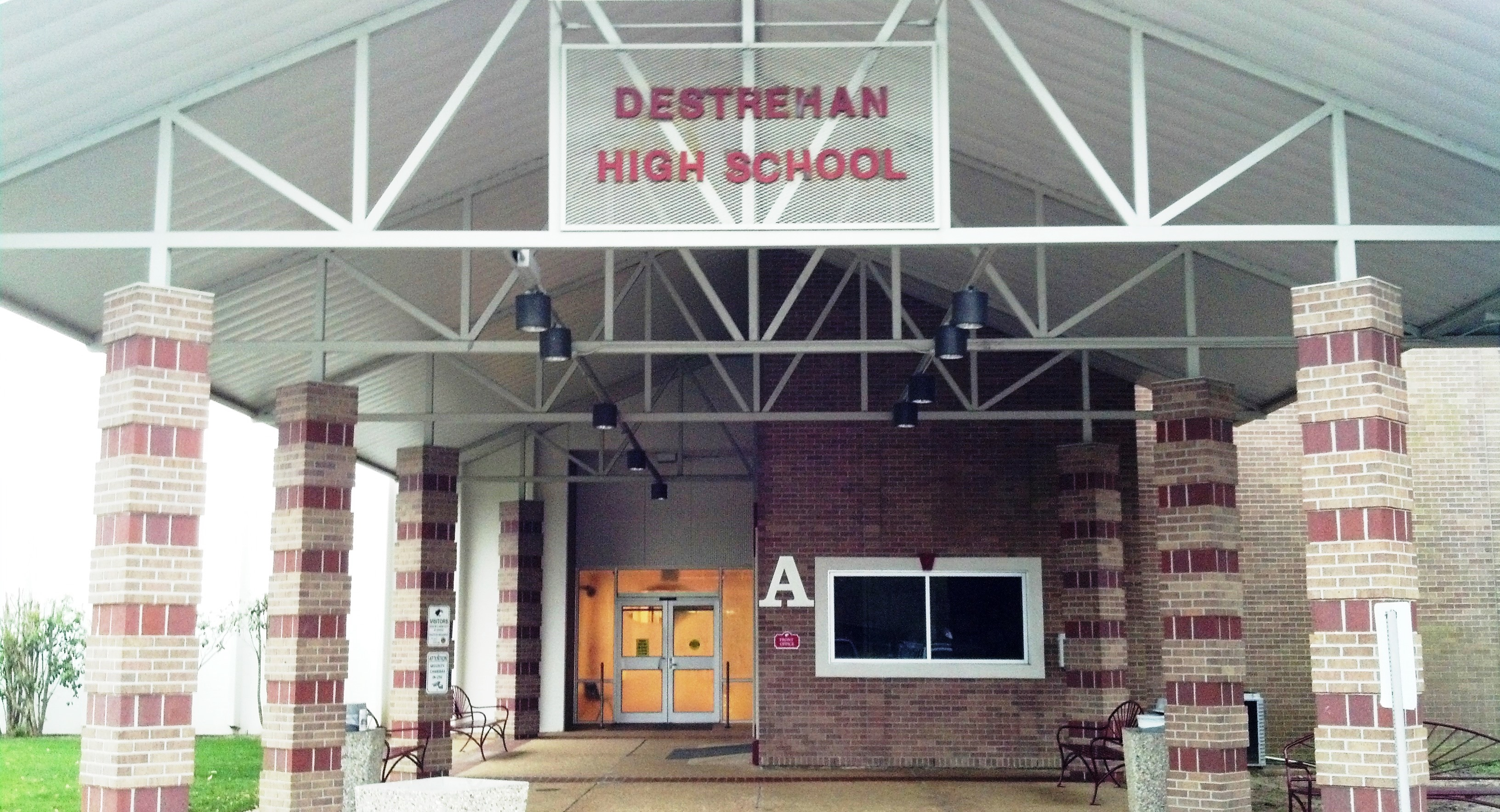
Destrehan High School

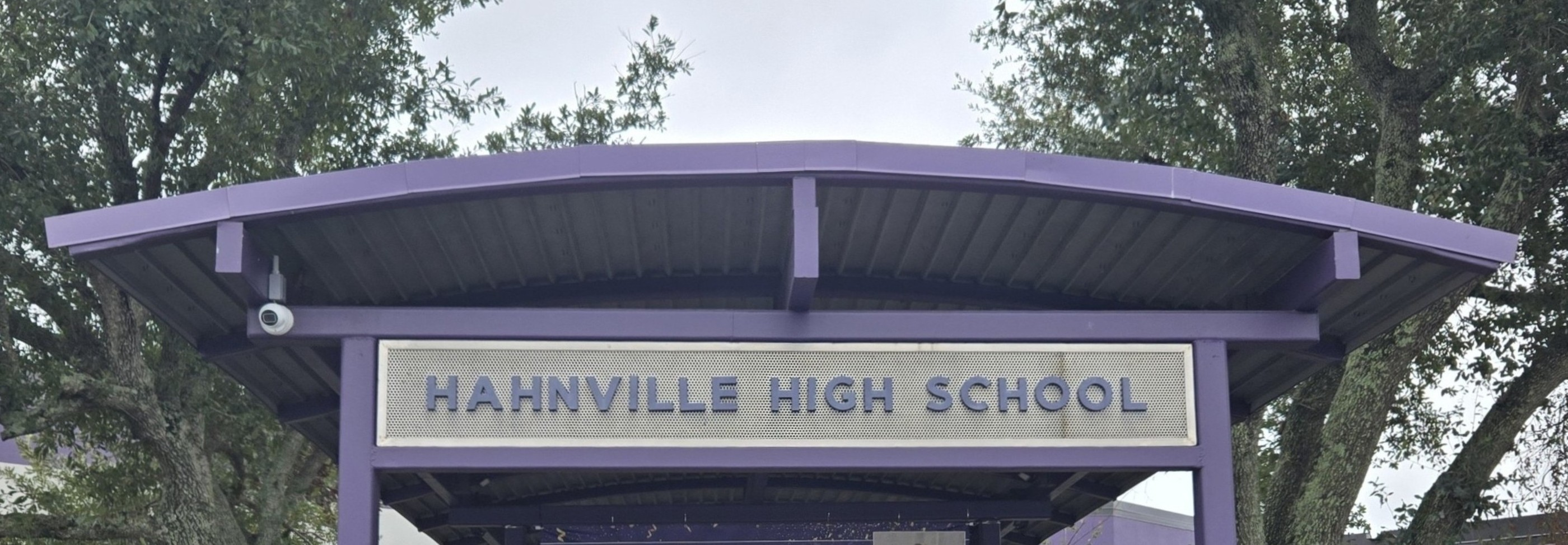
Hahnville High School

- Grades 9-12
- Destrehan High School, Destrehan High School website, (Destrehan)
- Hahnville High School, Hahnville High School website, (Boutte)

=== Middle schools ===
- Grades 6-8
  - Harry M. Hurst Middle School (Destrehan)
  - J.B. Martin Middle School (Paradis)
  - Albert Cammon Middle School (St. Rose)
  - R.K. Smith Middle School (Luling)

=== Elementary schools ===
- Prekindergarten-Second (2nd) Grade
  - Allemands Elementary School (1471 WPA Road Allemands, LA 70030)
  - Mimosa Park Elementary School (222 Birch Street Luling, LA 70070)
  - New Sarpy Elementary School (130 Plantation Road Destrehan, LA 70047)
- Third (3rd) Grade-Fifth (5th) Grade
  - Lakewood Elementary School (501 E.Heather Drive Luling, LA 70070)
  - RJ Vial Elementary School (510 Louisiana Street Paradis, LA 70080)
  - Ethel A. Shoeffner Elementary School (140 Plantation Road Destrehan, LA 70047)
- Prekindergarten-Fifth (5th) Grade
  - Luling Elementary School (904 Sugarhouse Road Luling, LA 70070)
  - Norco Elementary School (102 Fifth Street Norco, LA 70079)
  - St. Rose Elementary School (230 Pirate Drive St. Rose, LA 70087)

=== Other Campuses ===
- Satellite Center (285 Judge Edward Dufresne Parkway, Luling, LA 70070)
- Dr. Rodney R. Lafon Performing Arts Center (275 Judge Edward Dufresne Parkway, Luling, LA 70070)
- Eual J. Landry, Sr. Alternative Center
- Professional Learning Center
- Head Start Centers

== Former schools ==
=== High Schools ===
- Destrehan High School (original campus) - The original main building was damaged by fire and demolished. A head start center uses former high school buildings on the site and Harry Hurst Middle School is also located on the property and uses the former high school gymnasium.
- G.W. Carver High School - Served black students on the West Bank. Now the site of a head start center operated by the parish.
  - Closed in 1969 due to desegregation: High school students moved to Hahnville High School
- Hahnville High School (original campus) - The original building was demolished and Eual J. Landry Alternative Center sits on the former site. The alternative center continues to use the old cafeteria and gymnasium from the original high school.
- Mary M. Bethune High School - Served black students on the East Bank.
  - Closed in 1969 due to desegregation: High school students moved to Destrehan High School and elementary school students went to various schools

=== Lower Schools ===
- A.A. Songy Kindergarten Center - Luling, Kindergarten center formerly located on the campus of Lakewood Elementary School.
- Allemands Elementary (original campus) - Des Allemands
- Ama School - Ama
- Bayou Gauche School - Bayou Gauche
- Boutte Elementary School - Boutte
- Comardelle Village School - Comardelle Village
- Destrehan Jr. High School - Destrehan. Renamed Harry M. Hurst Middle School.
- Eual J. Landry Sr. Middle School - Hahnville, Eual J. Landry Sr. Alternative Center is now located there.
- Good Hope Elementary/Good Hope Primary School - Good Hope
- Hahnville Colored School - Hahnville
- Hahnville Elementary School - Hahnville
- Hahnville Jr. High School - Hahnville. Renamed Eual J. Landry Sr. Middle School.
- Killona Elementary - Killona
- Killona School - Killona
- Montz School - Montz
- New Sarpy Kindergarten Center - New Sarpy, Located on the campus of New Sarpy Elementary School after kindergarten center and elementary school merger.
- New Sarpy School - Middle school in New Sarpy
- Paradis Colored School - Paradis
- Paradis Consolidated School/Youngs School - Paradis
- Paradis Elementary School - Paradis
- Pecan Grove Elementary School - Destrehan
- Rosenwald School - School for black students in Killona
- St. Rose Elementary School (back school) - St. Rose, Renamed Albert Cammon Middle School.
- St. Rose Primary School (front school) - St. Rose, Renamed St. Rose Elementary School.
- St. Rose School - Elementary school in St. Rose

== Demographics ==
- Total Students (as of October 1, 2007): 9,639
- Gender
  - Male: 52%
  - Female: 48%
- Race/Ethnicity
  - White: 58.84%
  - African American: 36.39%
  - Hispanic: 3.38%
  - Asian: 1.06%
  - Native American: 0.32%
- Socio-Economic Indicators
  - At-Risk: 45.12%
  - Free Lunch: 35.73%
  - Reduced Lunch: 9.39%

== School Board ==
Public education in the parish is overseen by the St. Charles Parish School Board, which consists of elected members representing school districts within the parish. The board president is selected from among its members.

1	Ellis A. Alexander
2	Ray Gregson
3	Scott Cody
4	Karen L. Boudreaux
5	John L. Smith
6	Becky D. Weber
7	Art Aucoin
8	Alex Suffrin

== See also ==
- List of school districts in Louisiana
