= Shell plant explosions in Norco, Louisiana =

Incidents in 1973 and 1988

Two explosions occurred in the community of Norco, Louisiana in 1973 and 1988. The incident in 1973 occurred when a sixteen-year-old, Leroy Jones, was cutting grass for Helen Washington, who was taking a nap on her porch in the Diamond community. The plant released a plume of gas. A spark from the lawnmower ignited the plume of gas and the flames that resulted engulfed Leroy Jones and Helen Washington. The second explosion occurred in 1988. An early morning explosion from the plant killed seven Shell workers, destroyed homes in the Diamond community, and released 159 million pounds (72 kt) of chemical waste into the atmosphere. Residents still suffer from early illnesses and deaths as a result of the toxic fumes. Citizens have fought Shell Oil since the 1973 explosion. On June 11, 2002, the Concerned Citizens of Norco finished open discussions and negotiations with Shell Oil. The settlement created two programs, the Property Purchase Program and the Home Improvement Program. These programs allow the citizens to either sell their property to Shell at fair price or benefit from programs aimed at improving the Diamond community.

== Background information ==
Norco, Louisiana is located along the Mississippi River approximately 25 miles (40 km) west of New Orleans. The community is in between a chemical plant and an oil refinery. Norco is a part of what is known as "Cancer Alley". Norco is named for the New Orleans Refining Company. In 1916, a Shell affiliate built an oil refinery on the site of an antebellum plantation. In 1953, Shell bought a second plantation site. The property that Shell bought was the site of a major slave revolt in 1811. Black sharecroppers were farming the land when Shell announced that they were building a chemical plant. The black sharecroppers moved across the road from the plantation and into a subdivision that became known as Diamond. Sharecroppers originally welcomed Shell because they thought that the company would bring more jobs. This wasn't the case. Shell hired predominantly educated white workers who were able to read and understand operating manuals. These workers moved into the nicer neighborhoods of Norco.

== Explosion of 1973 ==
The explosion occurred on a summer day in 1973. A Shell pipeline began to leak. The pipeline ran along Washington Street in the Diamond community. The pipeline also forms a fence line between the industrial facility and the Diamond community. Many residents recall seeing a white cloud of gas traveling down Washington Street. Nearby, Leroy Jones, a sixteen-year-old in the Diamond community, was cutting the grass at the home of Helen Washington, an elderly citizen of the Diamond community. Helen Washington was taking a nap on her front porch when Leroy Jones decided to take a break from cutting grass so he could talk to his neighbors. When he started the lawnmower again, a spark from the lawnmower ignited the fumes that had leaked from the Shell pipeline. This led to an explosion that severely burned Leroy Jones and burned down Helen Washington's house. Leroy Jones was taken to the hospital by emergency workers and was treated for injuries. He eventually died a few days later in the hospital. Helen Washington burned in her house and died immediately. It is unknown exactly how much the victims' families were compensated for the deaths. Several citizens claim that relatives of Helen Washington received $3,000 for her destroyed house and the land surrounding it. Citizens claim that the mother of Leroy Jones was paid $500 for the death of her son. There is no record of the fatalities and there is no mention of the accident in the Shell Norco Museum.

== Explosion of 1988 ==
At 3:37 a.m. on May 5, 1988, an explosion occurred in the catalytic cracking unit (CCU) of an oil and gas refinery. The explosion apparently was the result of corrosion of an 8-inch (200 mm) vapor line. This vapor line, under 270 pounds per square inch (1,900 kPa) pressure, ran from a 10-inch (250 mm) header that originated as the main overhead vapor line from the depropanizer column. The apparent instantaneous line failure released approximately 17,000 pounds (7,700 kg) of hydrocarbon vapor for approximately 30 seconds. A possible ignition source could have been the unit's superheater furnace. The damage pattern indicated that the explosion was probably an aerial explosion with an epicenter located in the area between the depropanizer and the CCU control room. Employees #1, #2, #4, #5, and #7 were found fatally injured inside the CCU control room as a direct result of the blast. Employee #3 was found fatally injured approximately 30 feet (9.1 m) outside the west side of the CCU control room as a direct result of the blast. Employee #6 was fatally injured while he was exiting the GO-1 South control room. Damage from the explosion radiated one mile (1.6 km) from the center of the explosion and debris could be found as far as five miles (8.0 km) from the center of the explosion. The blast could be heard approximately 25 miles (40 km) away in New Orleans. There were reports that the blast set off burglar alarms in New Orleans. The explosion caused a fire to burn for eight hours at the oil refinery before it was brought under control. Chemicals that escaped during the explosion resulted in cars and homes being covered by a black film. The governor declared a state of emergency in Norco and St. Charles Parish. Seven Shell workers were killed during the explosion and 48 residents and Shell workers were injured in the explosion. The explosion released 159 million pounds (72 kt) of toxic chemicals into the air, which led to widespread damage and the evacuating of 4,500 people.

== Chemical-related illnesses ==
Many of the residents of the Diamond community suffer from sickness and illness associated with the oil refinery. Many residents claim that they suffer from headaches, nausea, dizziness, congestion, sore throats, and difficulty breathing on a regular basis. Residents claim that when they leave the Diamond area, their health improves. Once they return, their health begins to deteriorate again. A study was done in 1997 by Xavier University Deep South Center for Environmental Justice. The study concluded that 34% of children in the Diamond area suffer from asthma problems. One-fourth of all the women and children surveyed had to visit the hospital due to respiratory problems. Residents also claim to suffer from psychological issues associated with the explosions of 1973 and 1988. Some of the residents claim that they sleep in their clothes so that they will be ready to evacuate in the case of another explosion. Residents also claim that they have flashbacks of the 1973 and 1988 explosions.

== Concerned Citizens of Norco ==
Since the explosion of 1973 and 1988, a group called the Concerned Citizens of Norco has attempted to engage in open discussions with Shell Chemical LP. The group has tried to resolve difference with Shell regarding the Voluntary Property Purchase program, "a program designed to create greenbelt space along the fence lines of the Shell and Motiva Enterprises (Motiva) facilities in Norco, Louisiana that was offered to residents living on two of the four streets that make up the tight-knit and historic Diamond neighborhood." The discussions have resulted in Shell having a greater appreciation for the Diamond community. Both sides have also talked about the Shell and Motiva Good Neighbor Initiative, which contains programs that aim to enhance the quality of life for the citizens of Norco and Diamond. Shell has created a program that consists of a Property Purchase Component and a Home Improvement Component. The Home Improvement Component gives residents of Diamond the opportunity to stay in the community and take advantage of the Good Neighbor Initiative. The component is designed to improve the lives of the citizens, help the community grow, and preserve the history of the community. The Property Purchase Component allows Diamond residents to sell their property to Shell at a fair price and leave the community. The difference between the two community of Diamond and Shell has been solved and both sides have agreed to more open discussion if the need arises. The agreement was signed into effect of June 11, 2002.

== Bibliography ==
- Bazelon, Emily. "Bad Neighbors." Legal Affairs: The Magazine at the Intersection of Law and Life May 2003: Web. 30 Nov. 2011.
- "Concerned Citizens of Norco Reach Agreement with Shell Chemical." Corpwatch: Holding Corporations Accountable. 20 June 2002. Web. 30 Nov. 2011. .
- Lerner, Steve. "Diamond: A Struggle for Environmental Justice in Louisiana's Chemical Corridor." Crisis in American Institutions. Eds. Jerome H. Skolnick, and Elliott Currie. Print.
- "Norco: Profile." Louisiana Bucket Brigade: Clean Air. Justice. Sustainability. 18 Oct. 2002. Web. 30 Nov. 2011. LA Bucket Brigade : Norco.
- Rosen, Ruth. "Toxic Terror." Dissent MagazineCommonweal. Web. 30 Nov. 2011.
