= Gregory A. Miller =

American politician and attorney

Member of the Louisiana Senate from the 19th district
- Incumbent
- Assumed office January 8, 2024
- Preceded by: Gary Smith Jr.

Member of the Louisiana House of Representatives from the 56th district
- In office January 9, 2012 – January 8, 2024
- Preceded by: Gary Smith, Jr.
- Succeeded by: Beth Billings

Personal details
- Born: 1962 (age 63–64)
- Party: Republican
- Parent: Ralph R. Miller (father)
- Education: Louisiana State University
- Website: www.gregmiller.org

Gregory A. Miller (born 1962) is an American politician and attorney who has served in the Louisiana Senate from the 19th district since 2024. He previously served in the Louisiana House of Representatives, representing the 56th district from 2012 to 2024. He is a member of the Republican Party.

== Early life, education, and career ==
Miller was born at Fort Sill in Lawton, Oklahoma in 1962.

Miller attended the Sacred Heart of Jesus School in Norco and the De La Salle High School, graduating in 1980. He studied political science at Louisiana State University, receiving a Bachelor of Arts in 1985 and a Juris Doctor degree from the Paul M. Hebert Law Center in 1988. Miller works as an attorney.

== Political career ==
Miller first ran as a Republican for the 56th district in the Louisiana House in 2011, winning in a runoff against Democratic candidate G. Ramachandran. He was reelected in 2015 and in 2019 without any opposition. In the House, Miller at various times chaired the House Civil Law Committee and the House and Governmental Affairs Committee.

Miller was term-limited from the House in 2023, and chose to run in the State Senate election for the 19th district, held by term-limited Democrat Gary Smith Jr. He defeated Democratic candidate Marilyn Bellock, a member of the St. Charles Parish Council, in the primary election, precluding the need for a runoff.

== Personal life ==
Miller lives in Norco, Louisiana. He is married to Amy Pfrimmer, a music professor at Tulane University. His father is Ralph R. Miller, who served in the Louisiana House for 22 years.

== Electoral history ==
2023 Louisiana's 19th State Senate district election
Primary election
Party	Candidate	Votes	%
Republican	Gregory A. Miller	19,416	68.83
Democratic	Marilyn Bellock	8,791	31.17
Total votes		28,207	100.0

2011 Louisiana's 56th House of Representatives district election
Primary election
Party	Candidate	Votes	%
Republican	Gregory A. Miller	6,532	49.59
Democratic	G. "Ram" Ramachandran	5,163	39.19
Republican	Emile Garlepied	1,478	11.22
Total votes		13,173	100.0
General election
Republican	Gregory A. Miller	5,201	62.33
Democratic	G. "Ram" Ramachandran	3,143	37.67
Total votes		8,344	100.0
