= Norco, Louisiana =

Norco
- Census-designated place
- Location of Norco in Louisiana
- Coordinates: 30°00′14″N 90°24′39″W
- Country: United States
- State: Louisiana
- Parish: St. Charles

Area
  - Total: 4.03 sq mi (10.45 km^{2})
  - Land: 3.45 sq mi (8.93 km^{2})
  - Water: 0.59 sq mi (1.52 km^{2})
- Elevation: 7 ft (2.1 m)

Population (2020)
  - Total: 2,984
  - Density: 865.2/sq mi (334.04/km^{2})
- Time zone: UTC-6 (CST)
  - Summer (DST): UTC-5 (CDT)
- ZIP code: 70079
- Area code: 985
- FIPS code: 22-55525
- GNIS feature ID: 2403339

Norco is a census-designated place (CDP) in St. Charles Parish, Louisiana, United States. The population was 2,984 at the 2020 census. The community is home to a major Shell/Valero manufacturing complex. The CDP's name is derived from the New Orleans Refining Company.

== Etymology ==
The community of Norco was once called "Sellers," after a wealthy family there. In 1911, the land was purchased by an agent for Shell Oil, and the subsidiary New Orleans Refining Company (NORCO) was established. The community's name was officially changed from Sellers to Norco sometime after 1926.

== History ==
By the late 18th century, French and European colonial settlers had established numerous sugar cane plantations. They imported enslaved Africans as laborers. As sugar cane cultivation was highly labor-intensive, the slave population greatly outnumbered the ethnic Europeans in the colony, a circumstance that continued after the Louisiana Purchase by the United States in 1803.

On January 8, 1811, planters were alarmed by the German Coast Uprising led by Charles Deslondes, a free person of color from Haiti (formerly the French colony of Saint-Domingue). It was the largest slave uprising in US history, though it resulted in few white fatalities. Deslondes and his followers had been influenced by the ideas of the French and Haitian revolutions. In 1809–1810, French-speaking refugees from the Haitian Revolution immigrated by the thousands to New Orleans and Louisiana: white planters and their slaves, and free people of color, adding to the French Creole, African and free people of color populations.

Deslondes led followers to the plantation of Col. Manuel André, where they had hoped to seize stored arms, but those had been moved. The band traveled downriver, gathering more slaves for the insurrection as they marched. They were armed simply with hand tools and accompanied their progress by drums. More than 200 men participated in the uprising; they killed two white men on their march toward New Orleans. The alarm was raised, and both militia and regular troops were called out by Gov. William C.C. Claiborne to put down the short-lived revolt. The white militia and troops killed 95 slaves in total, many immediately and others in executions after quick trials.

In 1942, a Catholic church, Sacred Heart of Jesus Church, was founded. Since 1995 members of the African American History Alliance of Louisiana have gathered annually at Norco in January to commemorate the events of the German Coast Uprising, when men of color reached for freedom decades before the American Civil War and emancipation. They have been joined by descendants of the insurgents. In 2021, Hurricane Ida passed through the area, leaving the oil refineries and chemical plants spewing toxic chemicals through flaring.

== Geography ==
Norco is located at 30°0′14″N 90°24′39″W (30.003753, -90.410824). The city is situated on the eastern edge of the large Bonnet Carré Spillway, which provides for an outlet from the Mississippi River to Lake Pontchartrain during flooding of the river.

According to the United States Census Bureau, the CDP has a total area of 3.4 square miles (8.8 km^{2}), of which 3.0 square miles (7.8 km^{2}) is land and 0.4 square miles (1.0 km^{2}) (12.83%) is water.

== Demographics ==
Historical population
Census	Pop.	Note	%±
1960	4,682		—
1970	4,773		1.9%
1980	4,416		−7.5%
1990	3,385		−23.3%
2000	3,579		5.7%
2010	3,074		−14.1%
2020	2,984		−2.9%
U.S. Decennial Census; 1950 1960 1970 1980; 1990 2000 2010

Norco first appeared as an unincorporated place in the 1960 U.S. census; and as a census designated place in the 1980 United States census. "Diamond" is a part of Norco that spans about four blocks and it is 100% African American. The other neighborhood in Norco is 98% white.

Norco CDP, Louisiana – Racial and ethnic composition Note: the U.S. Census Bureau treats Hispanic/Latino as an ethnic category. This table excludes Latinos from the racial categories and assigns them to a separate category. Hispanics/Latinos may be of any race.
Race / Ethnicity (NH = Non-Hispanic)	Pop 1990	Pop 2000	Pop 2010	Pop 2020	% 1990	% 2000	% 2010	2020
White alone (NH)	2,686	2,762	2,713	2,431	79.35%	77.17%	88.26%	81.47%
Black or African American alone (NH)	629	686	210	221	18.58%	19.17%	6.83%	7.41%
Native American or Alaska Native alone (NH)	11	14	10	4	0.32%	0.39%	0.33%	0.13%
Asian alone (NH)	16	10	14	15	0.47%	0.28%	0.46%	0.50%
Pacific Islander alone (NH)	x	0	2	0	x	0.00%	0.07%	0.00%
Some Other Race alone (NH)	2	1	3	7	0.06%	0.03%	0.10%	0.23%
Mixed Race or Multi-Racial (NH)	x	34	29	128	x	0.95%	0.94%	4.29%
Hispanic or Latino (any race)	41	72	93	178	1.21%	2.01%	3.03%	5.97%
Total	3,385	3,579	3,074	2,984	100.00%	100.00%	100.00%	100.00%

As of the 2020 United States census, there were 2,984 people, 1,201 households, and 750 families residing in the CDP.

== Education ==
St. Charles Parish Public School System operates public schools, including:

- Norco Elementary K-3 School
- Norco Elementary 4-6 School
- Destrehan High School in Destrehan

Prior to 1969 Mary M. Bethune High School in Norco served area black students; that year it closed, with high school students moved to Destrehan High School.

== Notable people ==
- Minor Hall, jazz drummer
- Tubby Hall, jazz drummer
- James Brown Humphrey, Musician, bandleader, and music instructor
- Damaris Johnson, NFL wide receiver/punt returner for the Philadelphia Eagles and Houston Texans
- Jamall Johnson, NFL and CFL linebacker and actor
- Rondell Mealey, NFL running back for the Green Bay Packers
- Gregory A. Miller, member of the Louisiana House of Representatives from St. Charles Parish, was reared in Norco.
- Ralph R. Miller, member of the Louisiana House from 1968 to 1980 and 1982 to 1992; father of Gregory A. Miller
- George T. Oubre, state senator from 1968 to 1972 for St. Charles, St. James, and St. John the Baptist parishes; candidate for state attorney general in December 1971, while residing in Norco
- Jeremy Parquet, NFL offensive lineman for the Kansas City Chiefs, St. Louis Rams and Pittsburgh Steelers
- Rusty Rebowe, NFL linebacker for the New Orleans Saints
- Tim Rebowe, Head football coach at Nicholls State University
- Darrington Sentimore, NFL defensive lineman for the Cincinnati Bengals
- Gary Smith, Jr., Louisiana state senator

== See also ==
- Fenceline community
- Mary M. Bethune High School
- Shell plant explosion in Norco, Louisiana
