= Luling, Louisiana =

- Census-designated place
- Location of Luling in Louisiana
- Coordinates: 29°54′48″N 90°21′50″W
- Country: United States
- State: Louisiana
- Parish: St. Charles
- Named for: Florenz Albrecht Luling, local cotton merchant

Area
  - Total: 24.48 sq mi (63.39 km^{2})
  - Land: 23.29 sq mi (60.32 km^{2})
  - Water: 1.19 sq mi (3.07 km^{2})
- Elevation: 7 ft (2.1 m)

Population (2020)
  - Total: 13,716
  - Density: 588.9/sq mi (227.39/km^{2})
- Time zone: UTC-6 (CST)
  - Summer (DST): UTC-5 (CDT)
- ZIP code: 70070
- Area code: 985
- FIPS code: 22-46615

Luling is a census-designated place (CDP) in St. Charles Parish, Louisiana. The population was 11,512 at the 2000 census and 12,119 at the 2010 census. At the 2020 census, 13,716 people lived in Luling. It is located on the west bank of the Mississippi River. Luling is part of the New Orleans—Metairie—Kenner metropolitan statistical area.

== Geography ==
Luling is located at 29°54′48″N 90°21′50″W (29.913260, -90.364008) and has an elevation of 7 feet (2.1 m).

According to the U.S. Census Bureau, the CDP has a total area of 19.5 square miles (51 km^{2}) of which 18.5 square miles (48 km^{2}) is land and 1.1 square miles (2.8 km^{2}) (5.42%) is water.

== Demographics ==
Historical population
Census	Pop.	Note	%±
1960	2,122		—
1970	3,255		53.4%
1980	4,006		23.1%
1990	2,803		−30.0%
2000	11,512		310.7%
2010	12,119		5.3%
2020	13,716		13.2%
U.S. Decennial Census; 1950 1960 1970 1980; 1990 2000 2010

Luling first appeared as an unincorporated place in the 1960 U.S. census; and as a census designated place in the 1980 United States census.

Luling racial composition as of 2020
Race	Number	Percentage
White (non-Hispanic)	9,751	71.09%
Black or African American (non-Hispanic)	2,111	15.39%
Native American	57	0.42%
Asian	153	1.12%
Pacific Islander	5	0.04%
Other/Mixed	560	4.08%
Hispanic or Latino	1,079	7.87%

At the 2020 United States census, there were 13,716 people, 4,713 households, and 3,767 families residing in the CDP. At the 2019 American Community Survey, there were 14,049 people living in the community, spread among 4,869 housing units. The racial and ethnic makeup of Luling was 78.2% non-Hispanic white, 15.1% African American, 0.4% American Indian and Alaska Native, 2.2% Asian, 2.2% some other race, and 1.8% from two or more races. The median age was 35.9, and 6.8% of the population were under 5 years of age. The median household income was $89,034; males had a median income of $70,865 versus $48,382 for females. An estimated 9.5% of the population lived at or below the poverty line.

According to the 2000 United States census, there were 11,514 people, 3,899 households, and 3,224 families residing in the CDP. The population density was 622.7 inhabitants per square mile (240.4/km^{2}). There were 4,101 housing units at an average density of 221.8 units per square mile (85.6 units/km^{2}). The racial makeup of the CDP was 81.98% White, 15.50% African American, 0.26% Native American, 0.74% Asian, 0.03% Pacific Islander, 0.63% from other races, and 0.87% from two or more races. Hispanic or Latin Americans of any race were 2.69% of the population.

There were 3,899 households, out of which 44.8% had children under the age of 18 living with them, 66.6% were married couples living together, 11.9% had a female householder with no husband present, and 17.3% were non-families. 14.2% of all households were made up of individuals, and 4.9% had someone living alone who was 65 years of age or older. The average household size was 2.92 and the average family size was 3.23.

In the CDP, the population was spread out, with 29.9% under the age of 18, 8.4% from 18 to 24, 30.9% from 25 to 44, 21.6% from 45 to 64, and 9.2% who were 65 years of age or older. The median age was 35 years. For every 100 females, there were 94.0 males. For every 100 females age 18 and over, there were 94.2 males.

The median income for a household in the CDP was $56,114, and the median income for a family was $60,625. Males had a median income of $47,862 versus $26,869 for females. The per capita income for the CDP was $20,439. About 7.0% of families and 8.3% of the population were below the poverty line, including 10.8% of those under age 18 and 12.4% of those age 65 or over.

== Economy ==
Luling is home to a major chemical factory operated by Bayer and formerly Monsanto. The plant is best known for producing Roundup, a popular herbicide and making Monsanto the world's single largest producer of glyphosate. This plant, however, was involved in a string of Louisianan controversies involving environmental safety of industrial chemical production, especially carcinogens, contributing to the Cancer Alley nickname.

=== George Prince tragedy ===
Before the Destrehan-Luling Bridge was completed in 1983, connecting the communities of Destrehan and Luling, automobile ferries connected the towns. On October 20, 1976, one of these ferries, the George Prince, was struck by a tanker and capsized as it crossed the Mississippi River. Seventy-eight passengers and crew died.

== Education ==
St. Charles Parish Public School System operates public schools:

- Hahnville High School in Boutte
- R.K Smith Middle School (grades 6–8) in Luling, opened in 2006
- J. B. Martin Middle School (grades 6–8) in Paradis serves the Mimosa/Willowdale portions of Luling
- Lakewood Elementary School (grades 3–5) in Luling
- Mimosa Park Elementary School (grades K-2) in Luling
- Luling Elementary School (grades K-5) in Luling

== Events and traditions ==
Since 1978, Luling has held an annual Krewe of Lul parade on the weekend before Mardi Gras.

The Rotary Club of St. Charles Parish, Louisiana has held an annual Alligator Festival every September since 1980.

The United Way of St. Charles s hosts an annual 5K/10K race over the Hale Boggs Mississippi River Bridge each spring. United Way also holds their annual "Battle For The Paddle", a jambalaya & gumbo cook-off, in the fall.

== Notable people ==
- Darren Barbier - Head football coach at Nicholls State University
- Barbara Colley - romance and mystery writer
- Skyler Green - NFL wide receiver
- Chris Markey - College and Professional running back
- Darius Reynaud - NFL wide receiver
