= French colonial architecture =

Style of architecture used in French colonies

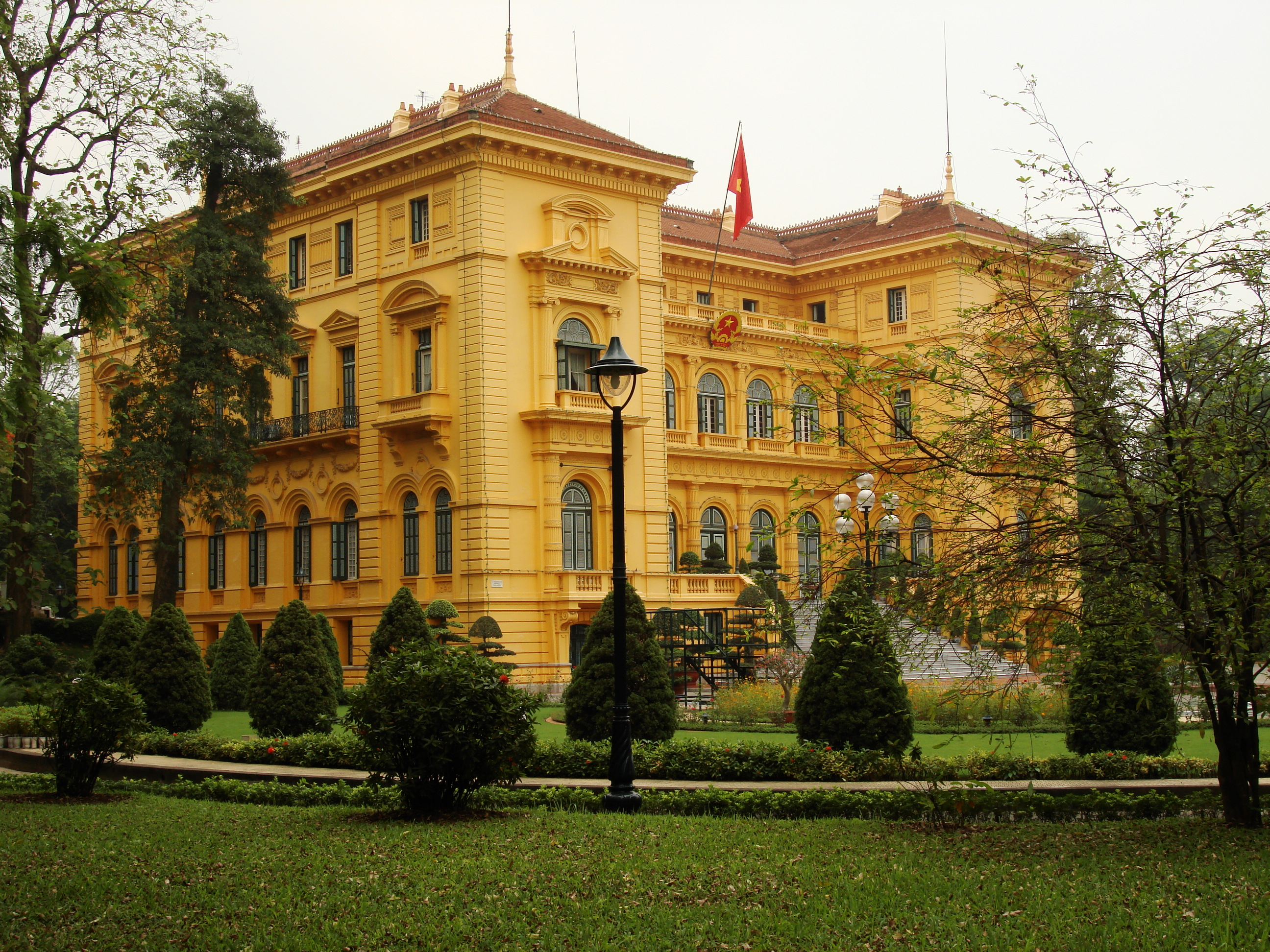
The Presidential Palace of Vietnam, in Hanoi, was built between 1900 and 1906 to host the French Governor-General of Indochina.

French colonial architecture includes several styles of architecture used by the French during colonization. French colonial architecture has a long history, beginning in North America in 1604 and being most active in the Western Hemisphere (Caribbean, Guiana, Canada, Louisiana) until the 19th century, when the French turned their attention more to Africa, Asia, and Oceania.

Many former French colonies, especially those in Southeast Asia, have previously been reluctant to promote their colonial architecture as an asset for tourism; however, in recent times, the new generation of local authorities has somewhat "embraced" the architecture and has begun to advertise it.

== In Africa ==
=== French Equatorial Africa ===
In the former French Equatorial Africa, Brazzaville, the capital of Congo, and Douala, the largest city of Cameroon have many French colonial buildings.

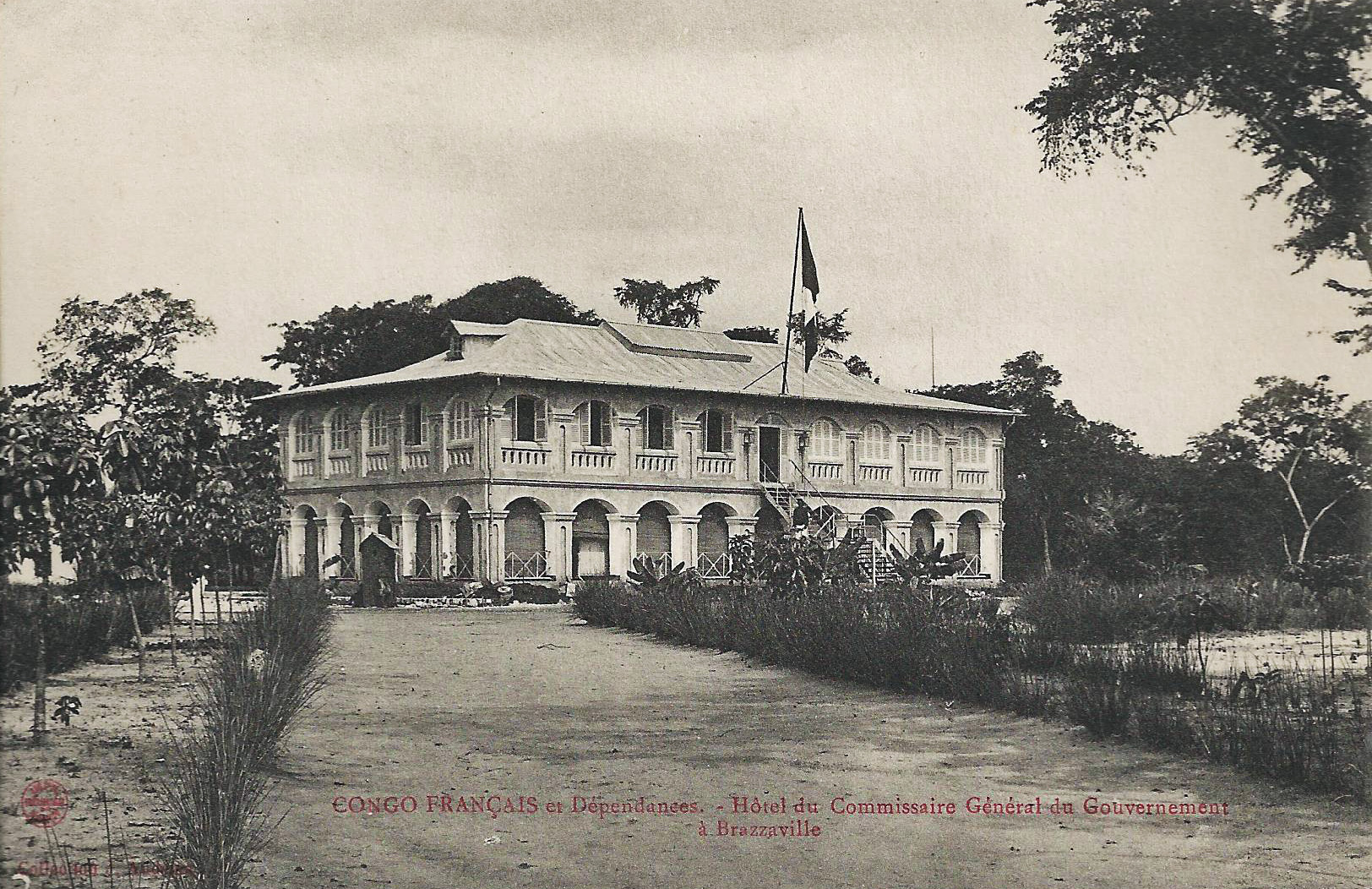
The headquarters for the French Commissioner General in Brazzaville (circa 1896–1910)

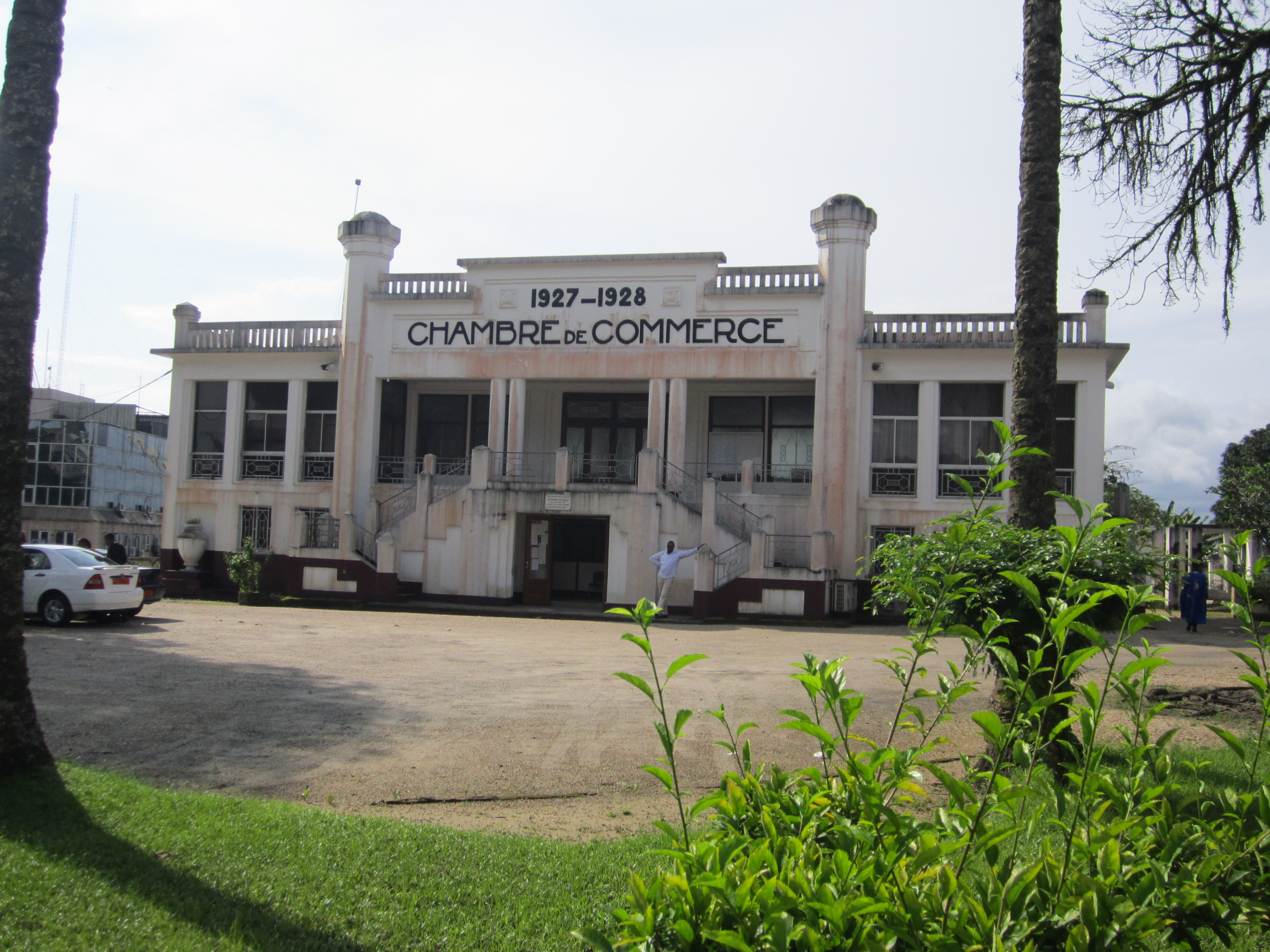
The Chambre of Commerce in Douala, Cameroon

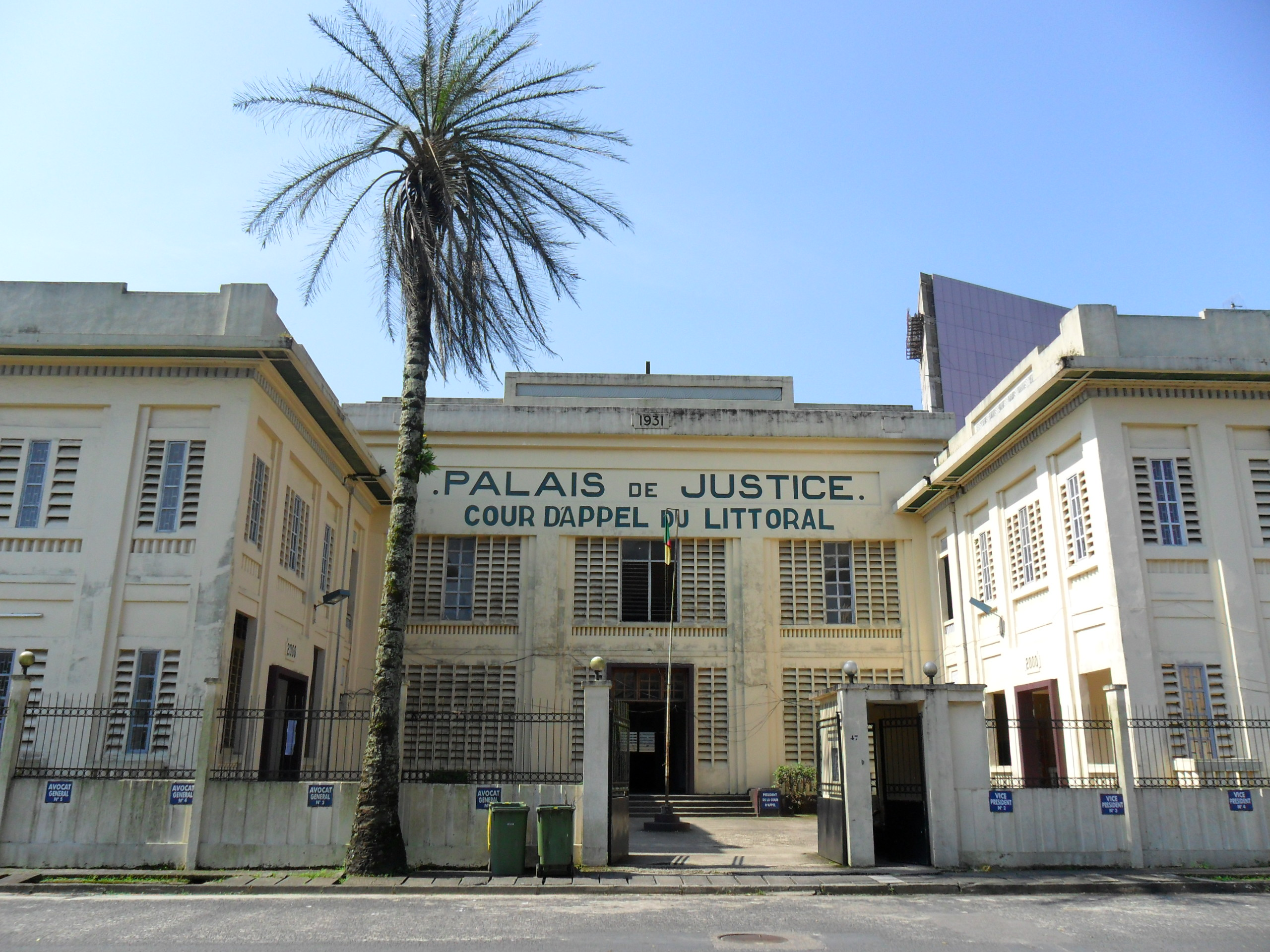
The Palace of Justice in Douala

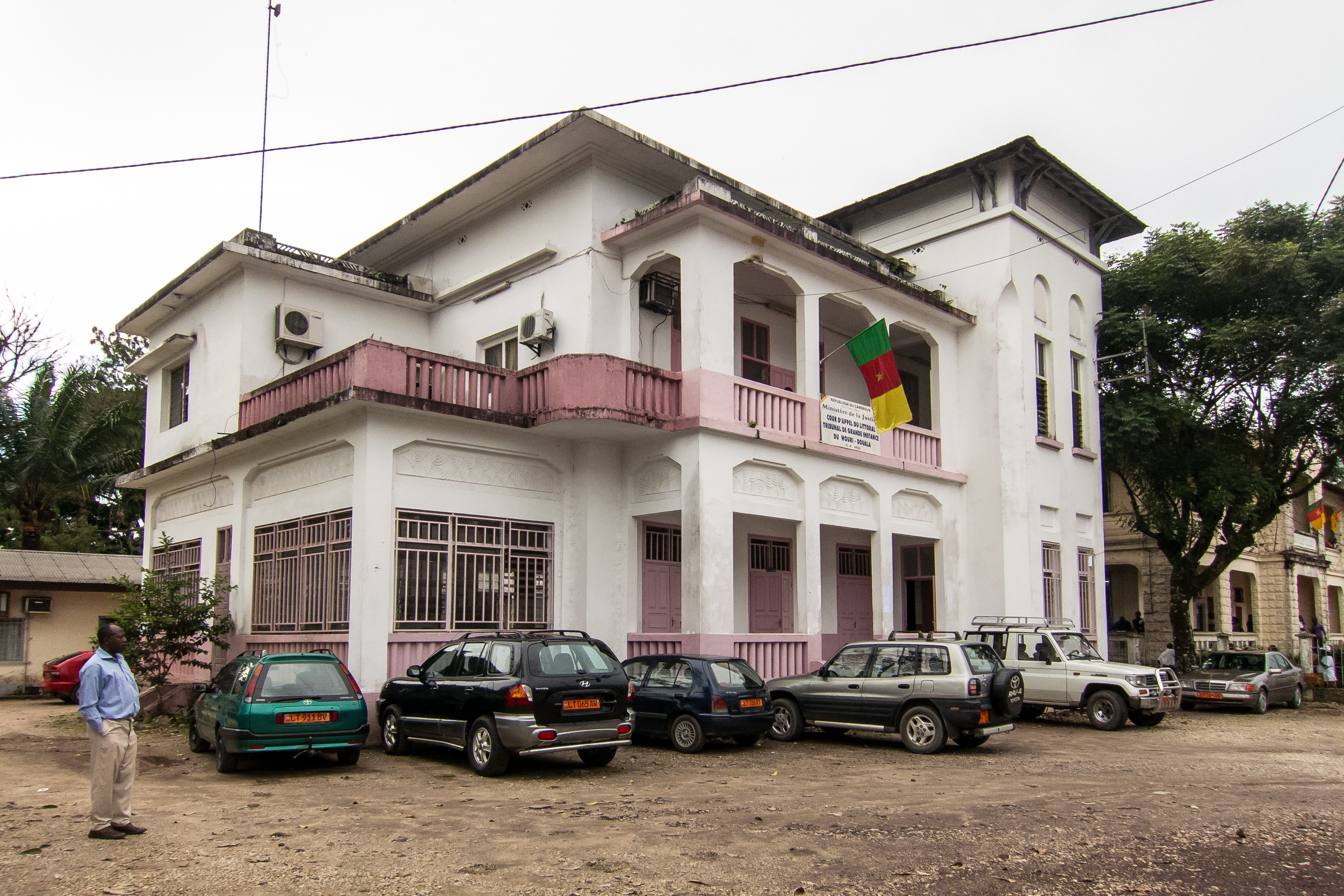
The former residence of the French regional governor in Douala

=== French North Africa ===
19th and early 20th-century French colonial architecture is typical of the European districts in former French North African countries including most Algerian and Tunisian cities, as well as Casablanca, Morocco. In the mid-20th-century, Algiers became an important center for Modernist architecture.

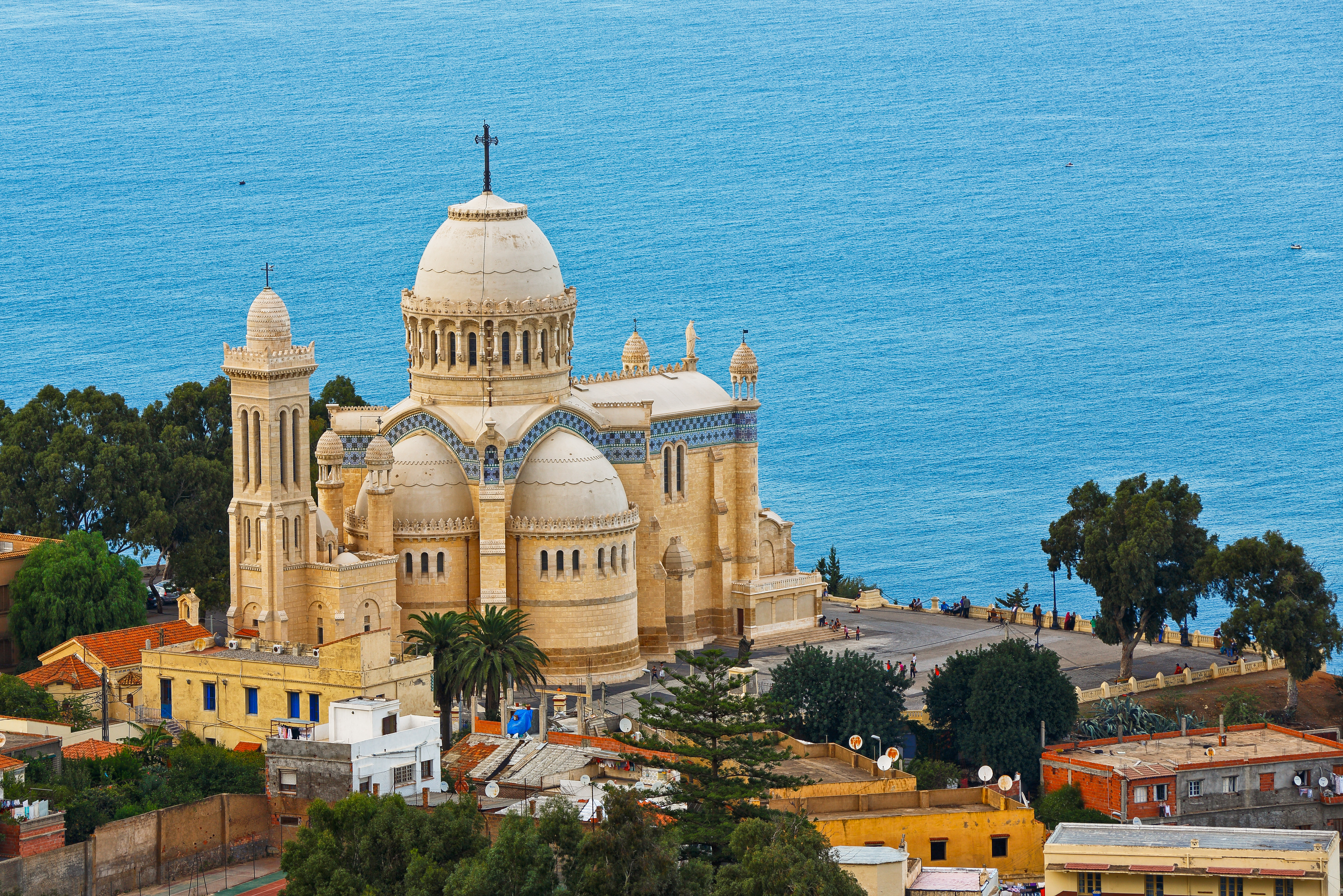
Notre-Dame d'Afrique basilica, Algiers, Algeria

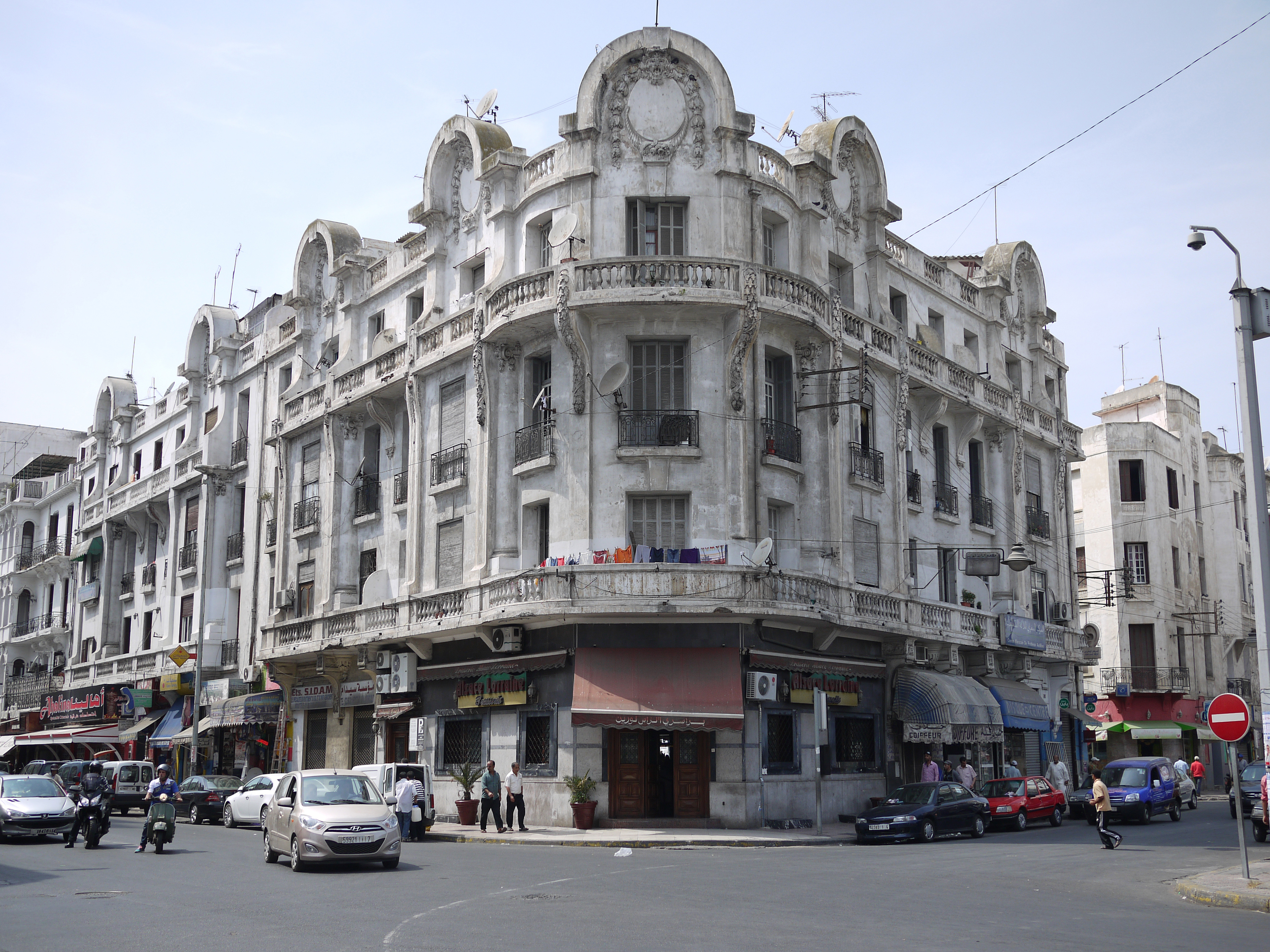
Apartment building in Casablanca, Morocco

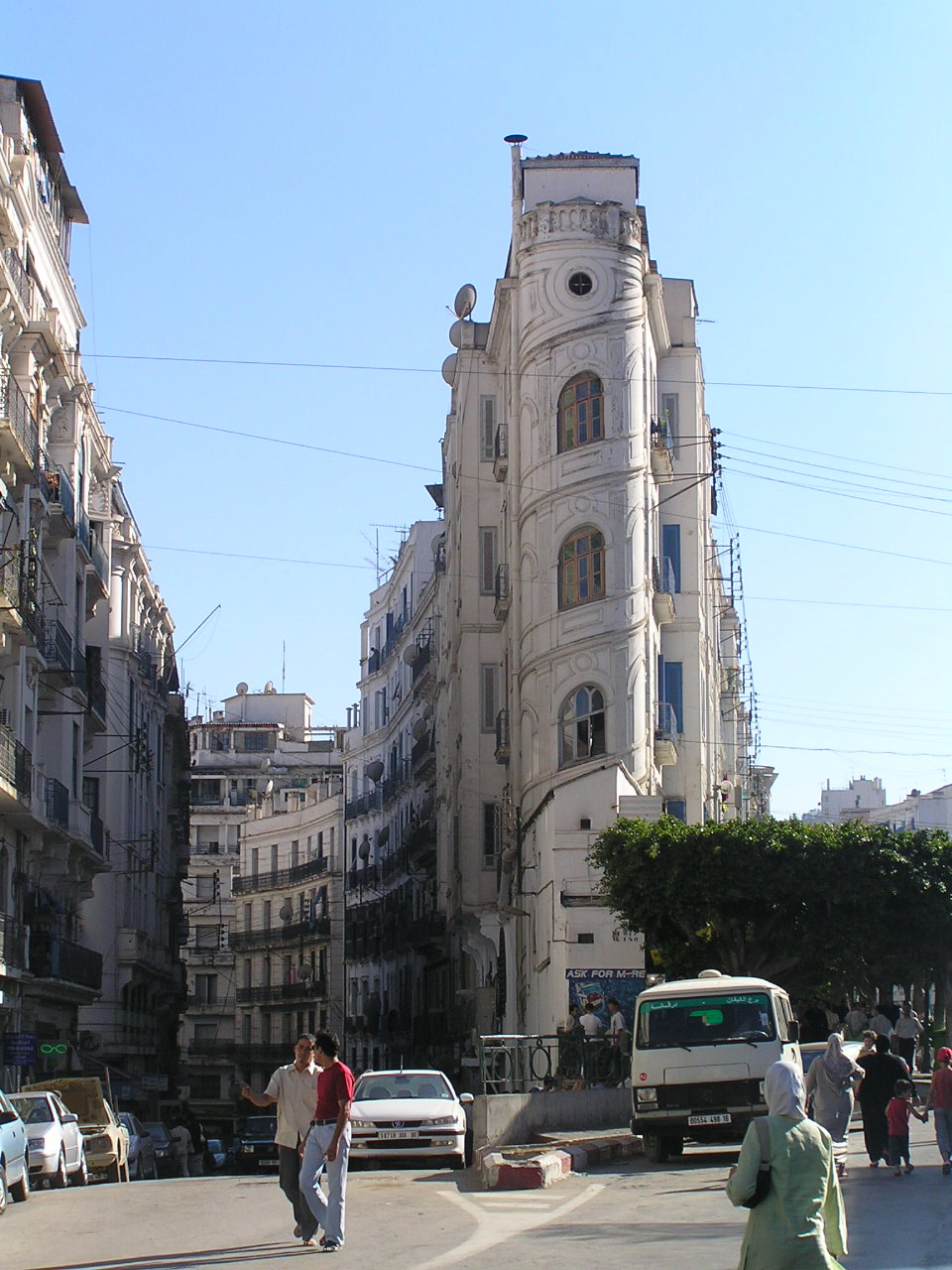
Apartment building in Algiers, Algeria

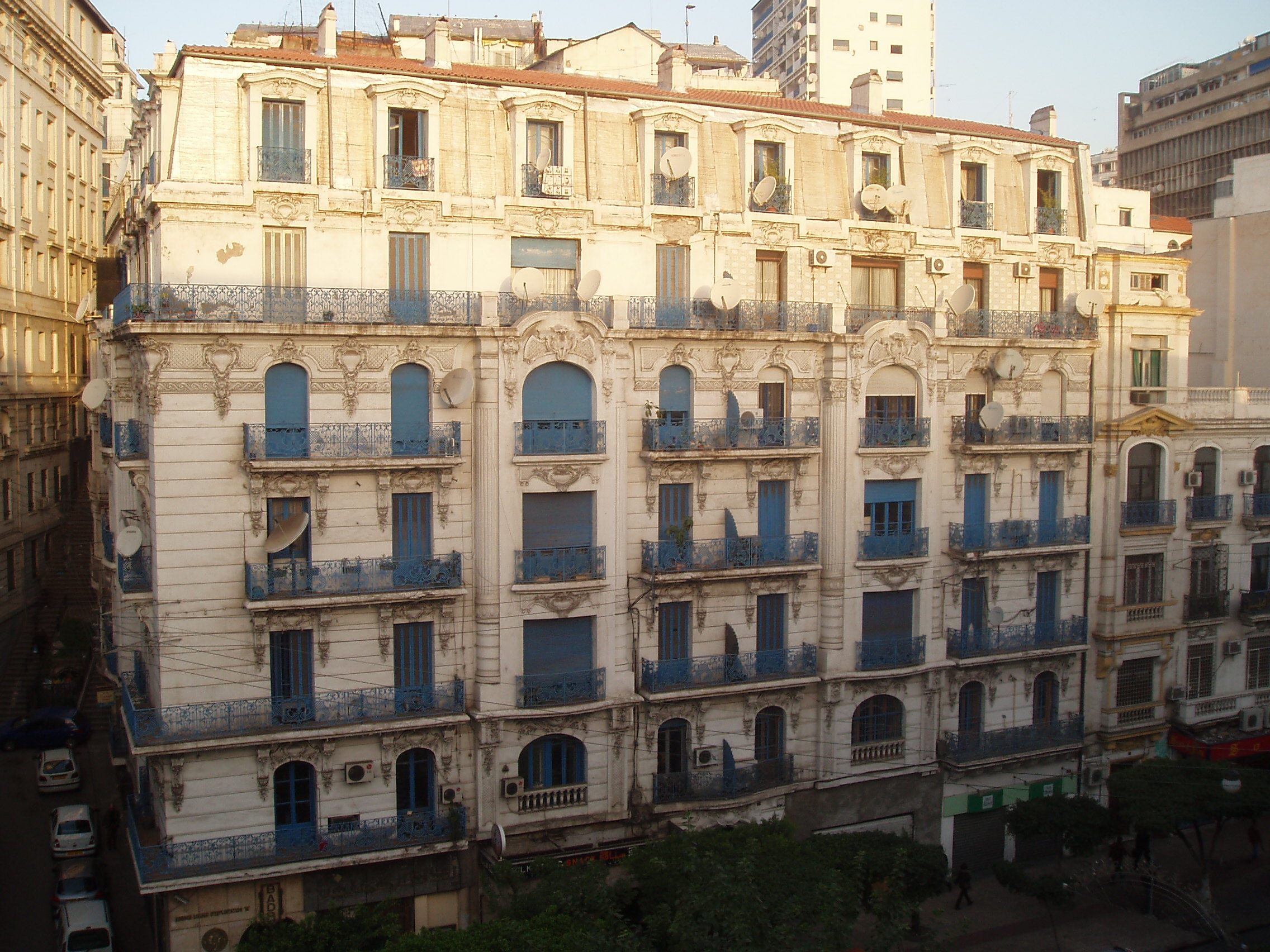
Apartment building on Rue Didouche-Mourad, Algiers, Algeria (formerly Rue Michelet)

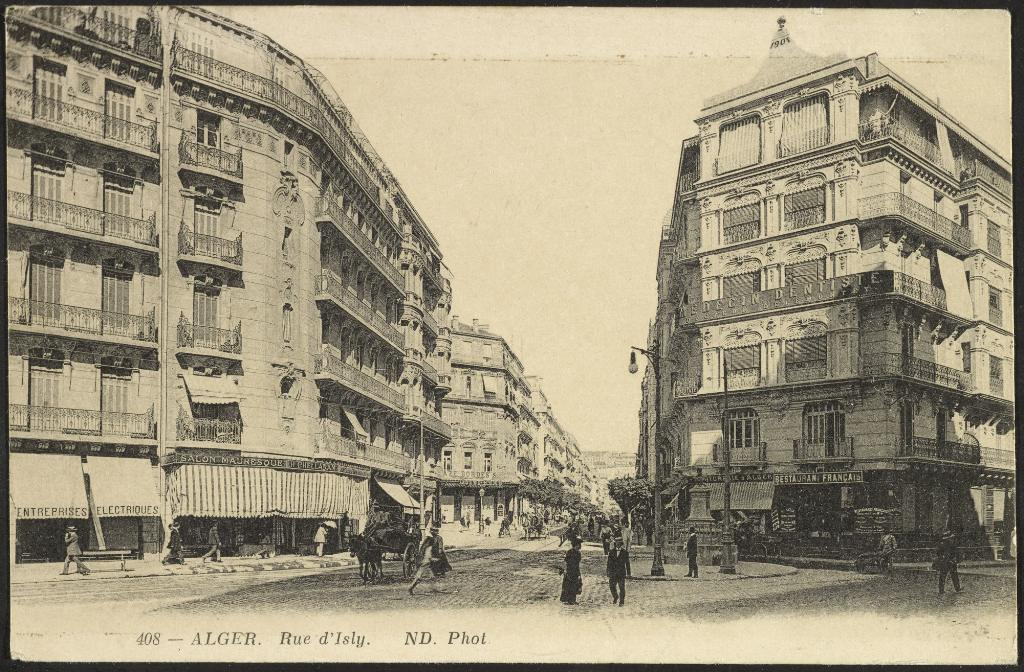
Rue d'Isly in Algiers (early 20th century)

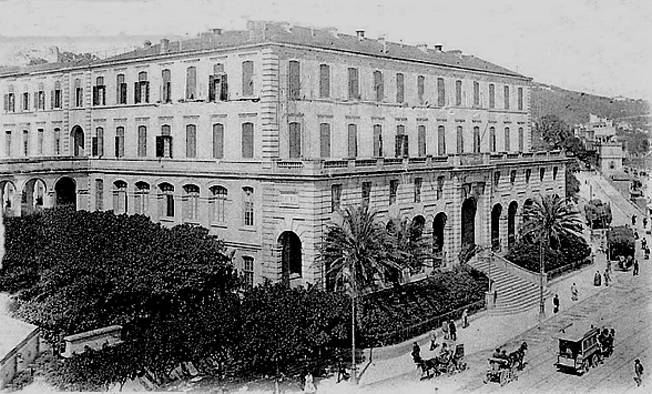
Lycée Bugeaud in Algiers (early 20th century)

=== French West Africa ===
French colonial architecture is found in many large and mid-sized former French West African cities, with a particularly significant concentration in the former capital city, Saint-Louis, Senegal.

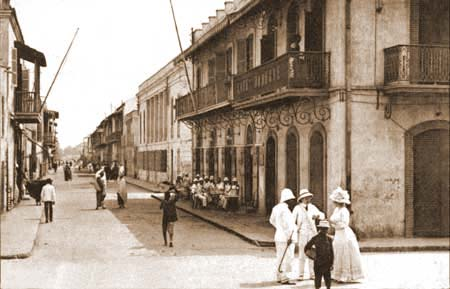
Rue Lebon in Saint Louis (circa 1900)

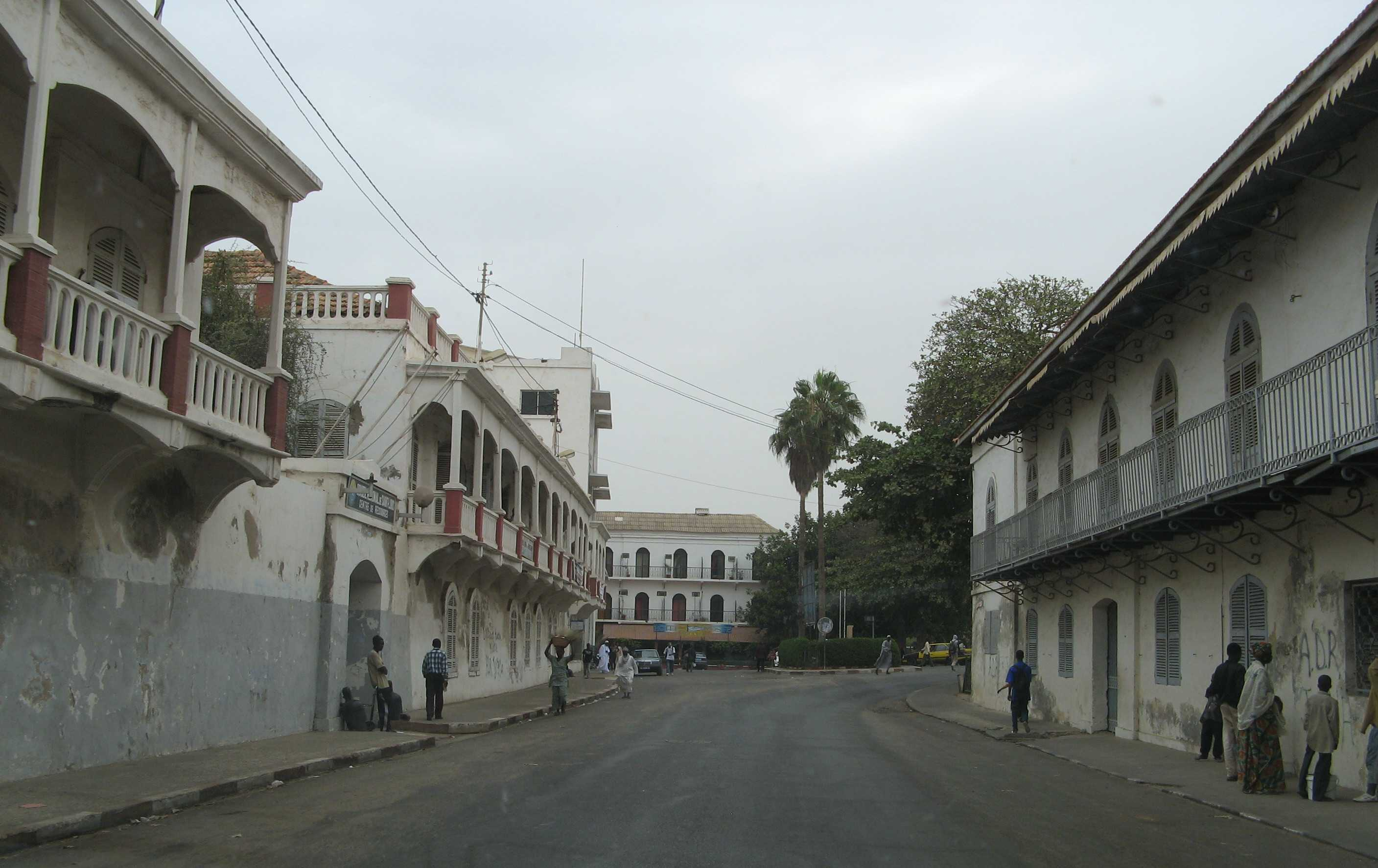
Colonial houses in Saint Louis

== In Asia ==
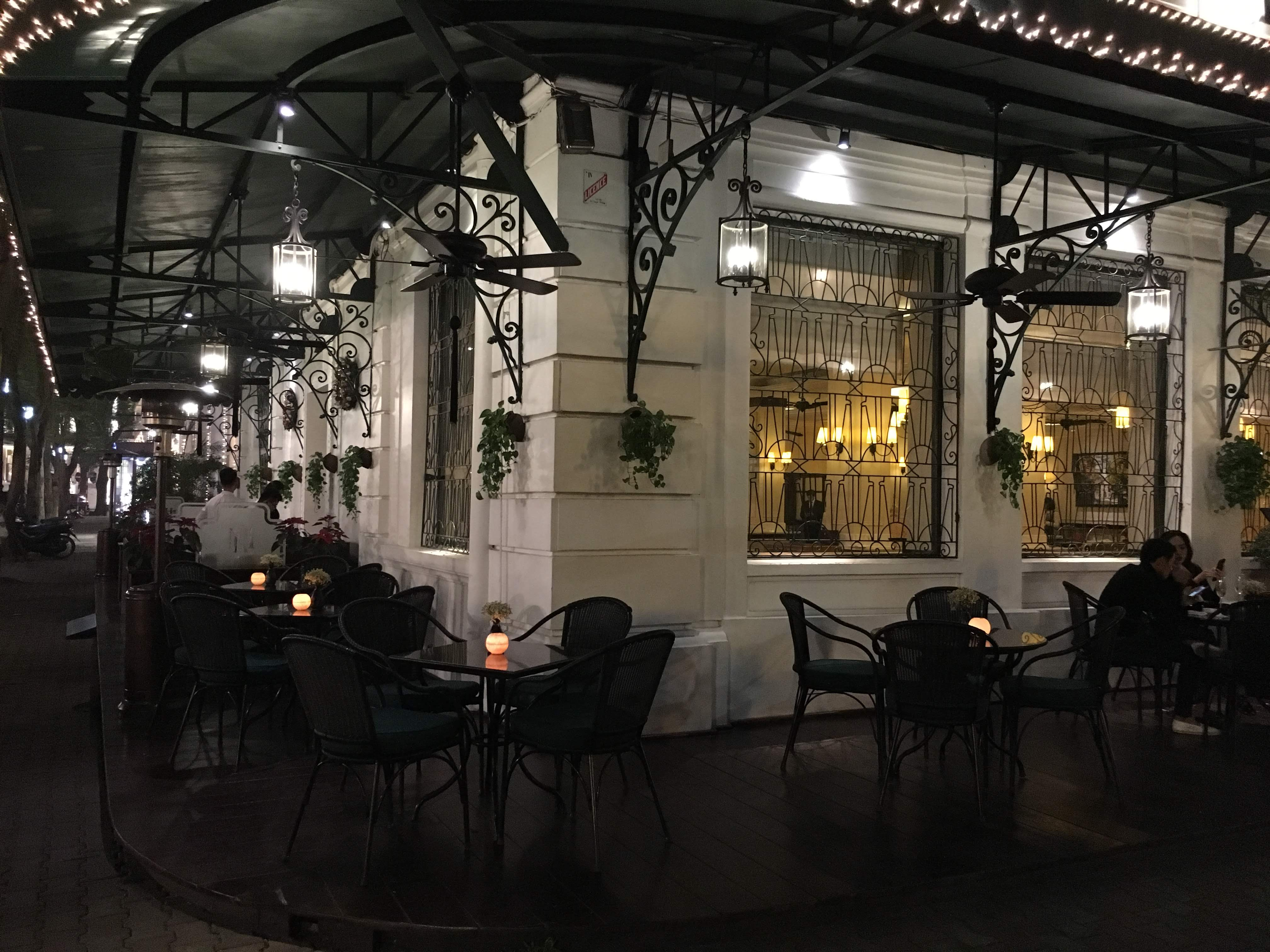
A bistro in central Hanoi with Art Nouveau and colonial designs

French colonisation of three countries in mainland Southeast Asia—Vietnam, Laos, and Cambodia, known as Indochina in the 19th and 20th centuries, left a lasting architectural legacy. Most French colonial buildings, now mostly transformed for public use, are located in large urban areas, namely Hanoi and Ho Chi Minh City (Vietnam), and Phnom Penh (Cambodia).

There are also some colonial buildings were built in China due to French concessions and other interests in the country during 19th and 20th centuries.

=== Cambodia ===
- In Phnom Penh:
  - Central Market
  - Phnom Penh
  - Hotel Le Royal
  - National Library of Cambodia
  - Villa Picturesque
  - Unesco Sino-Khmer Villa
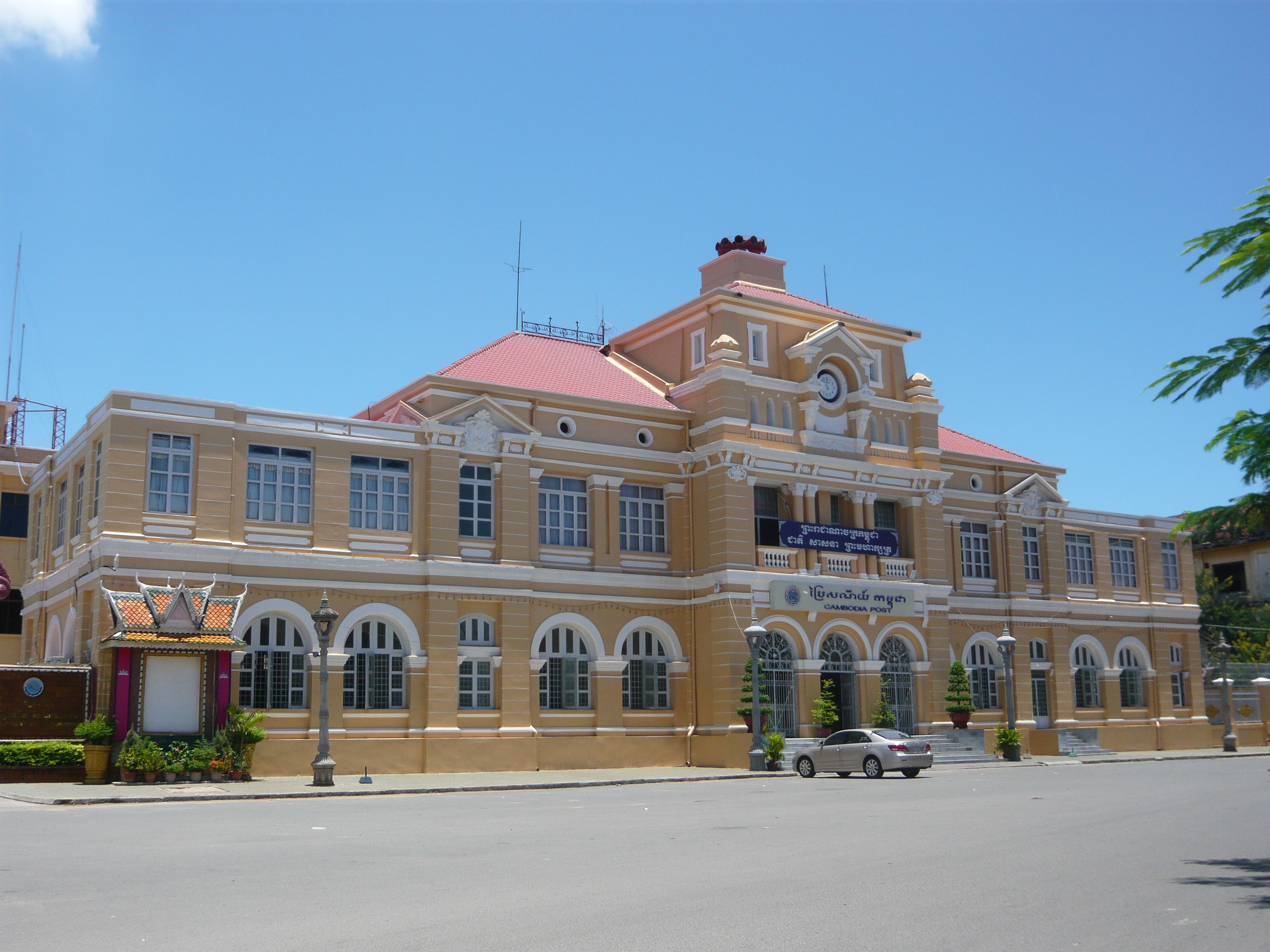
Phnom Penh Post Office

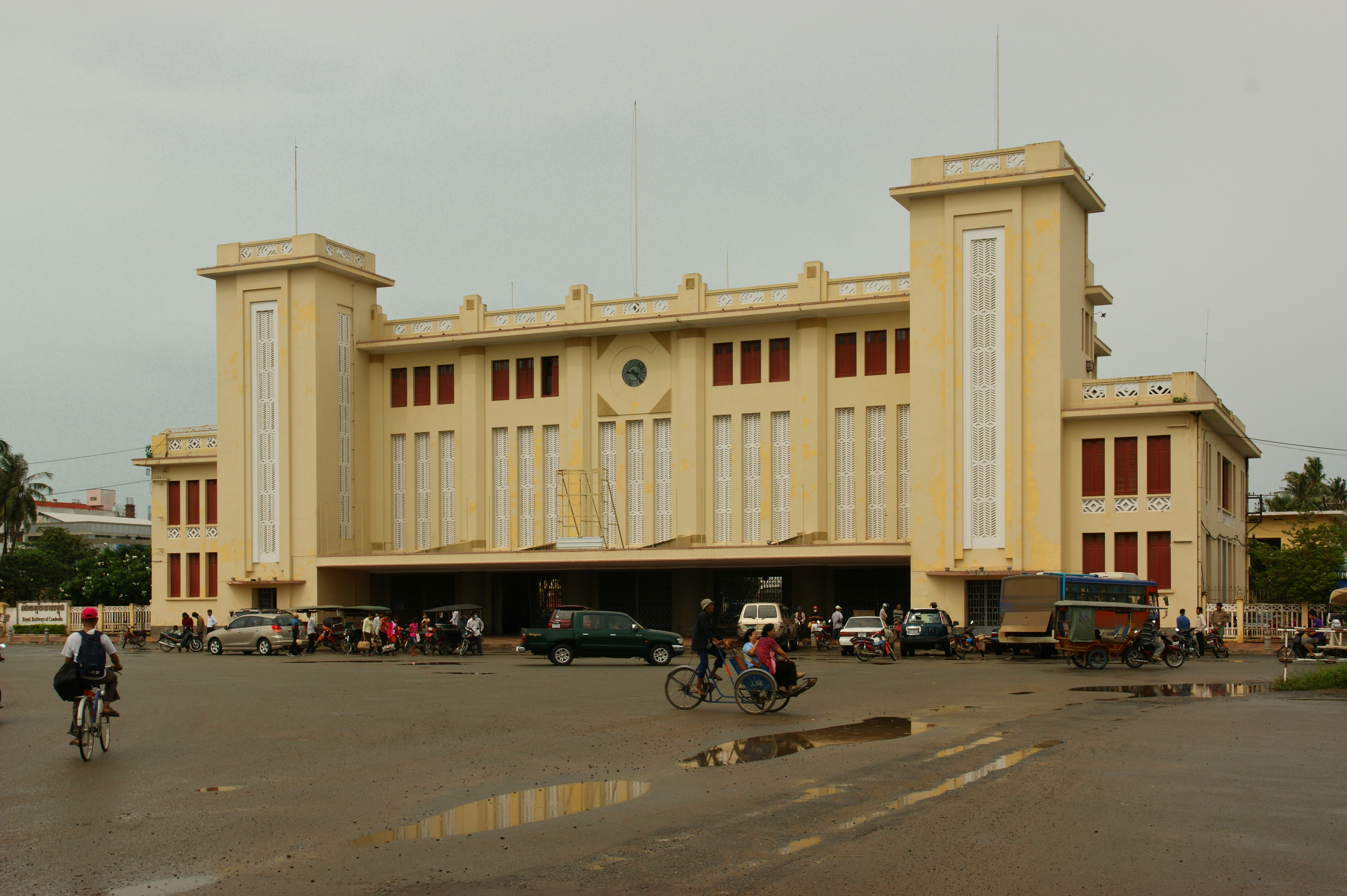
Phnom Penh Royal Railway Station

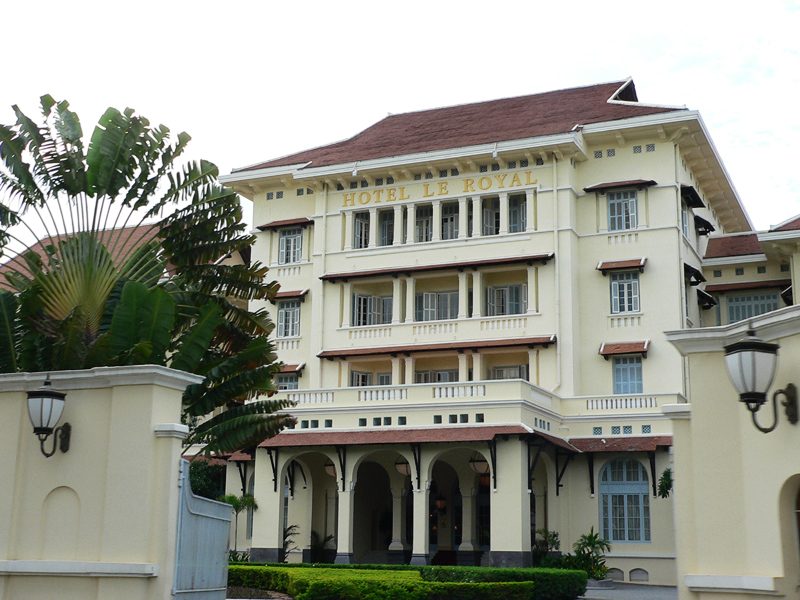
Raffles Hotel Le Royal

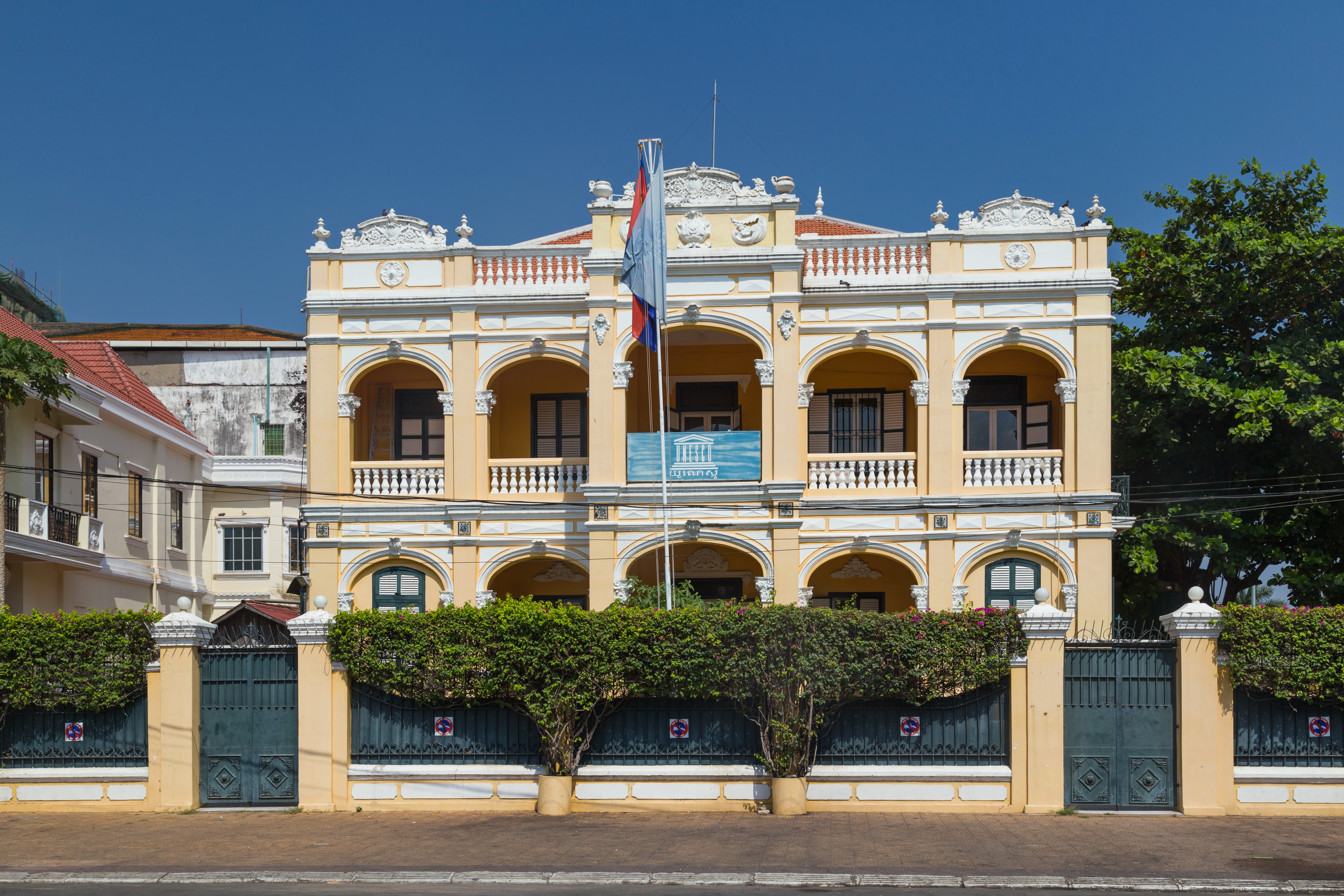
Phnom Penh UNESCO office

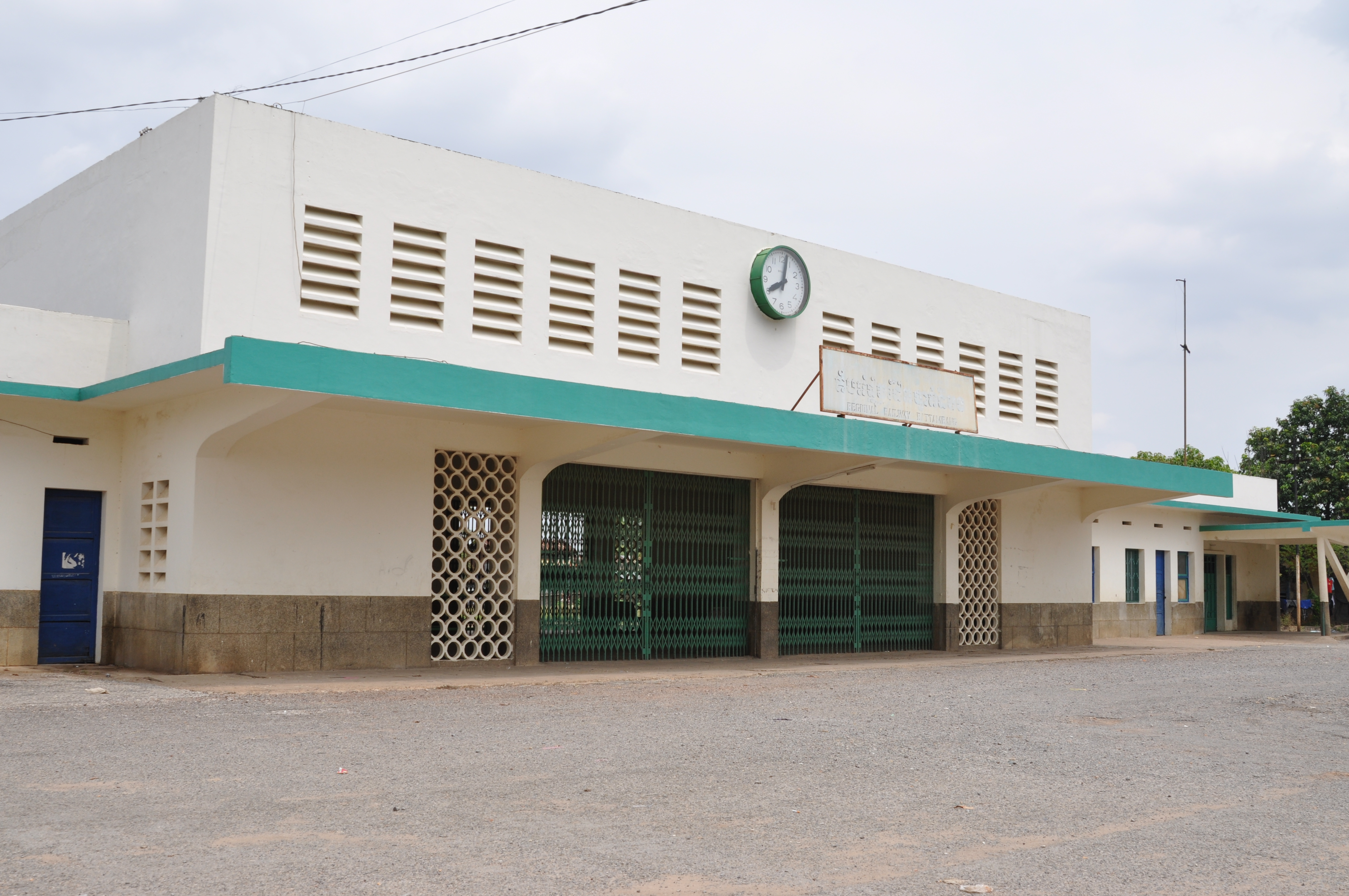
Railway station in Battambang

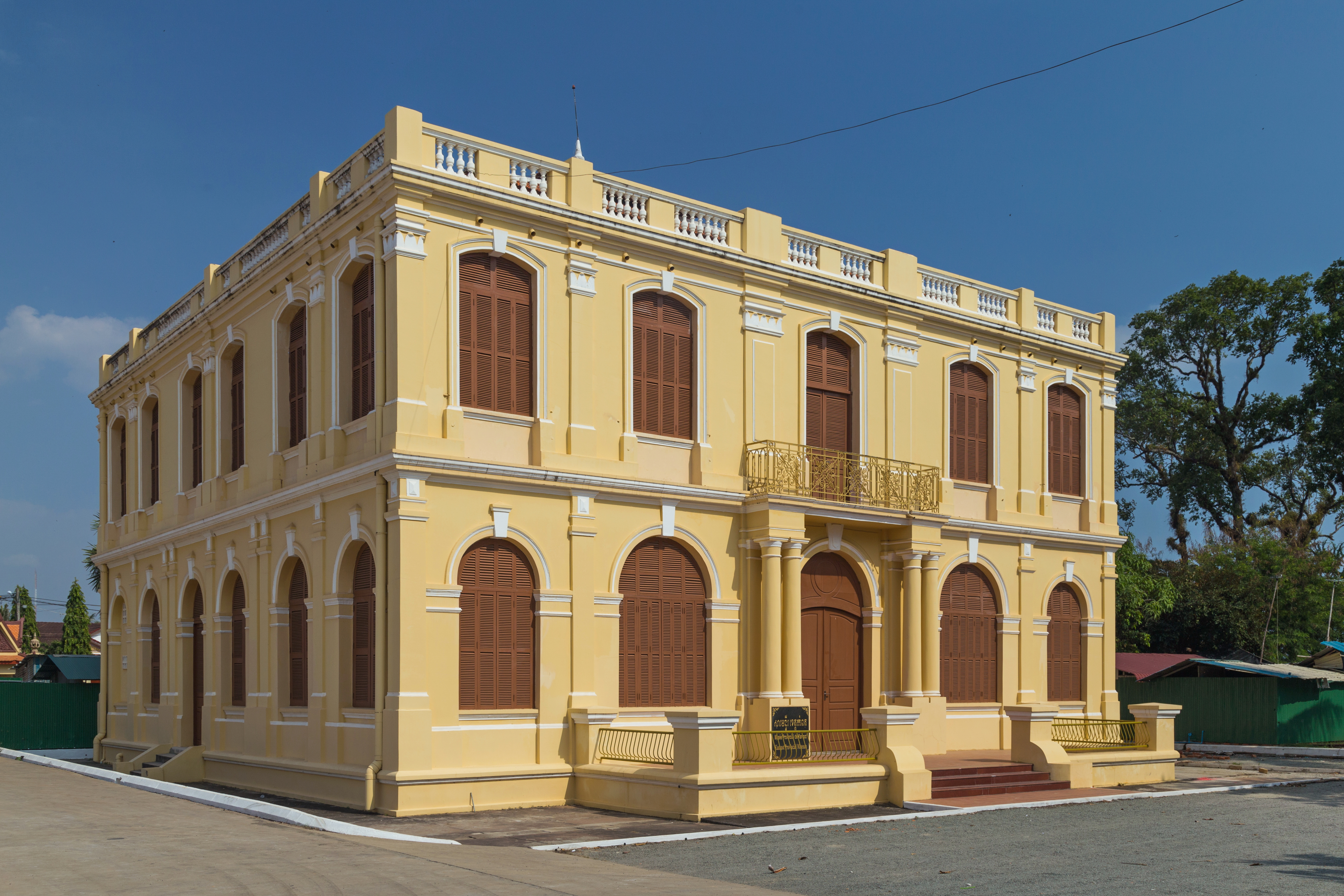
Building in Kampot

=== China ===
- In Beijing:
  - Banque de l'Indochine Building, Beijing
- In Tianjin:
  - French Municipal Administration Council Building, Tianjin
  - Banque de l'Indochine Building, Tianjin
  - Zizhulin Church
- In Shanghai:
  - Shanghai Museum of Arts And Crafts
  - Banque de l'Indochine Building, Shanghai
  - St. Joseph's Church, Shanghai
- In Wuhan:
  - Banque de l'Indochine Building, Hankou
- In Guangzhou
  - Our Lady of Lourdes Chapel, Shamian Island
- In Zhanjiang:
  - Former sites of the Residence of the French Commissioner and the French Army Commandantura of Guangzhouwan
  - Our Lady of Victory Cathedral, Zhanjiang
  - Naozhou Lighthouse
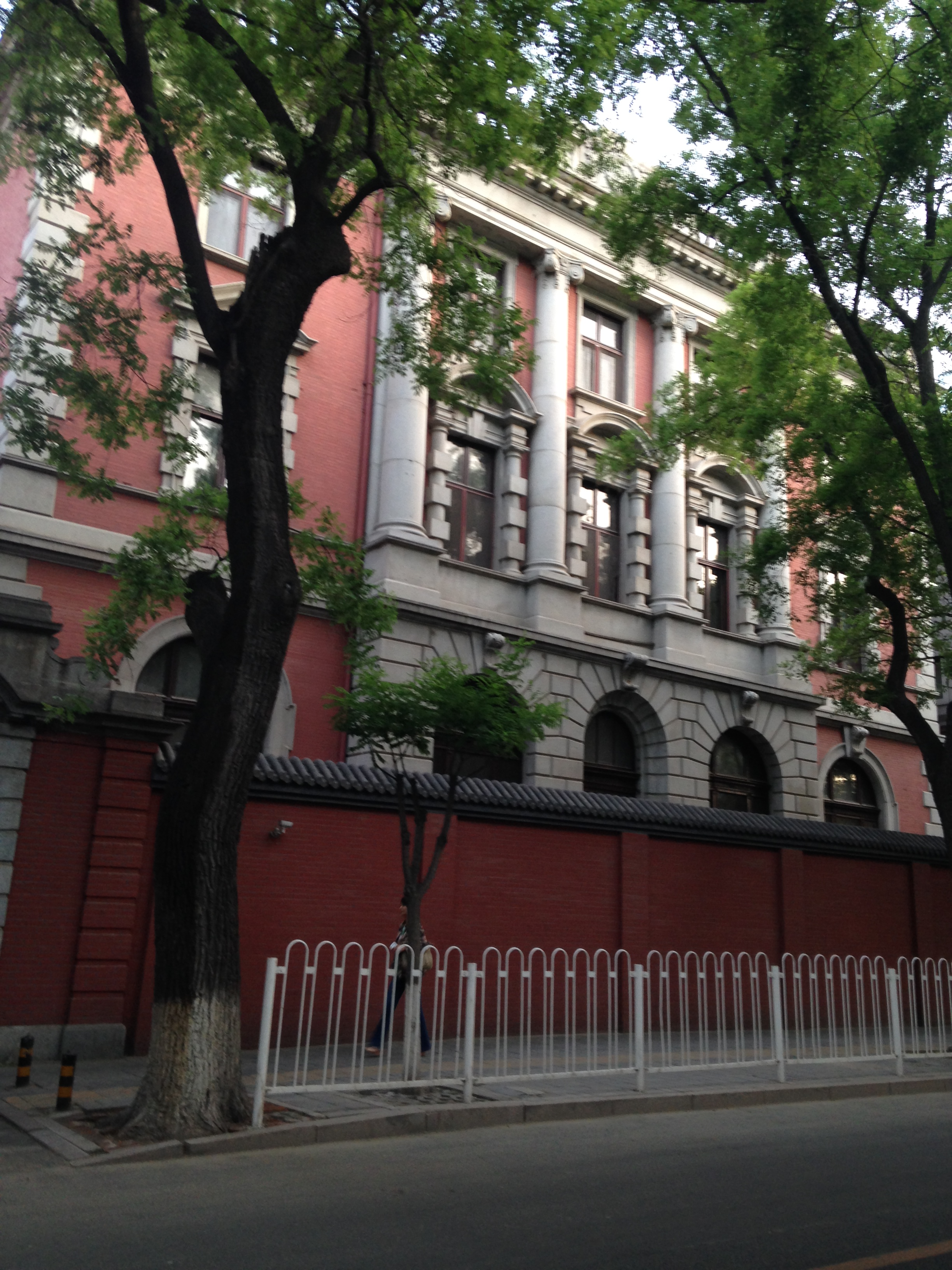
Banque de l'Indochine Building, Beijing

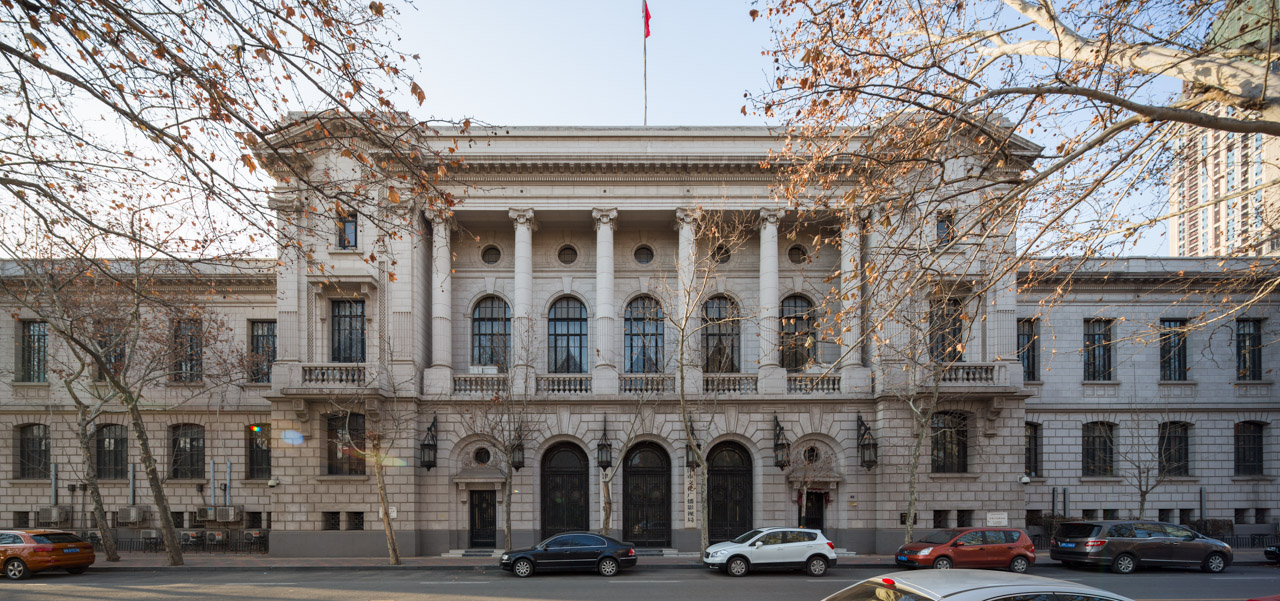
French Municipal Administration Council Building in Tianjin

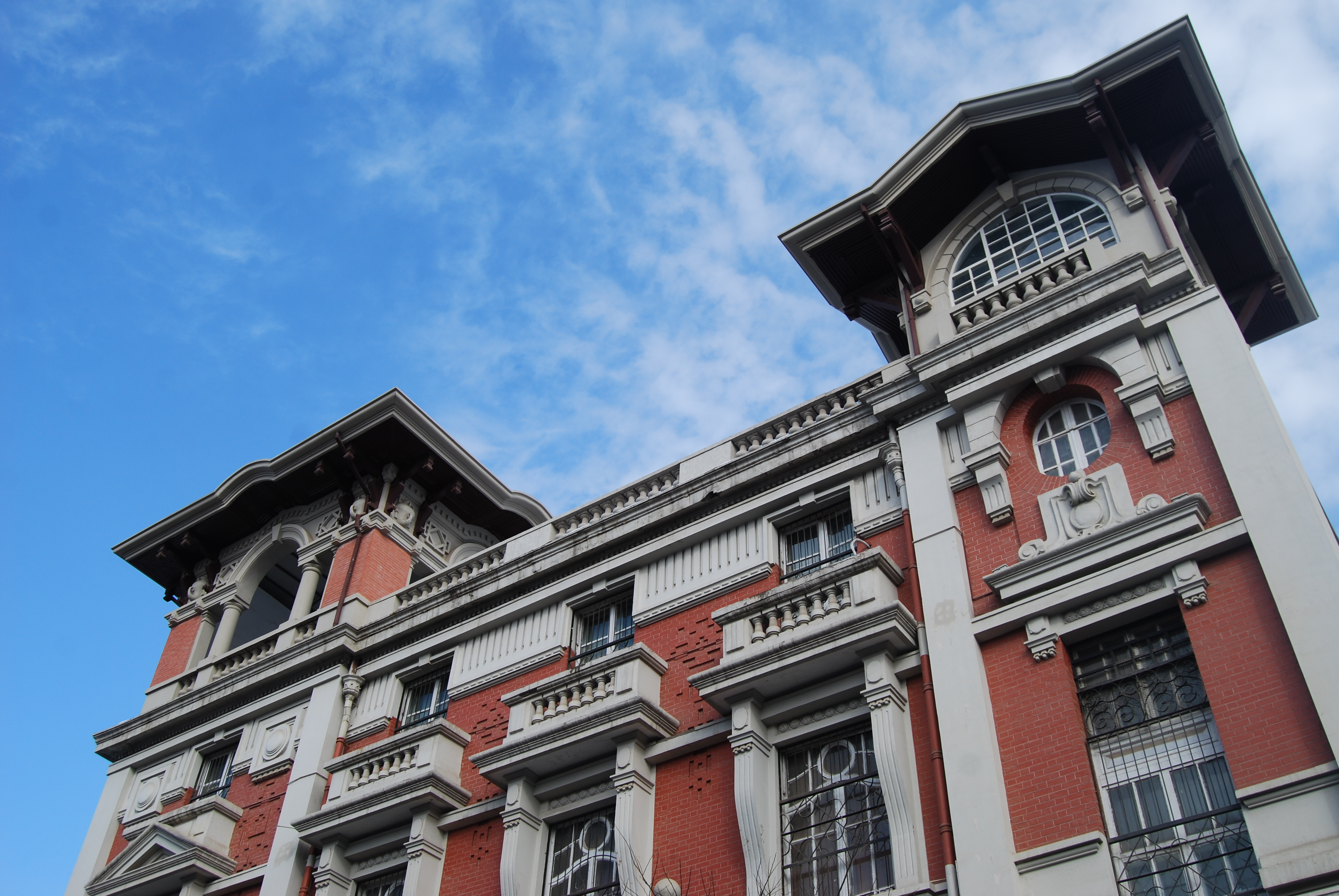
Banque de l'Indochine Building, Tianjin

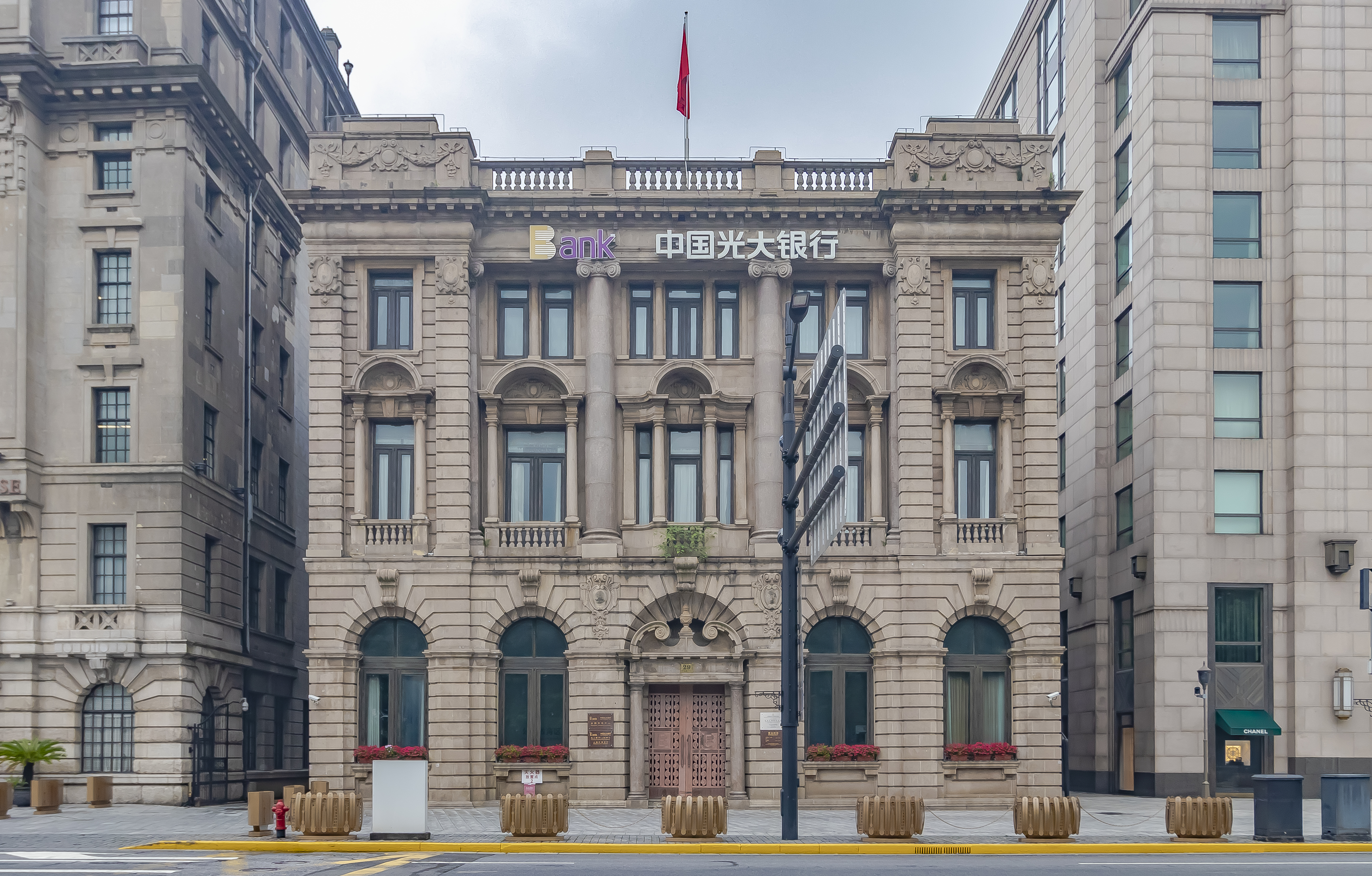
Banque de l'Indochine Building, Shanghai

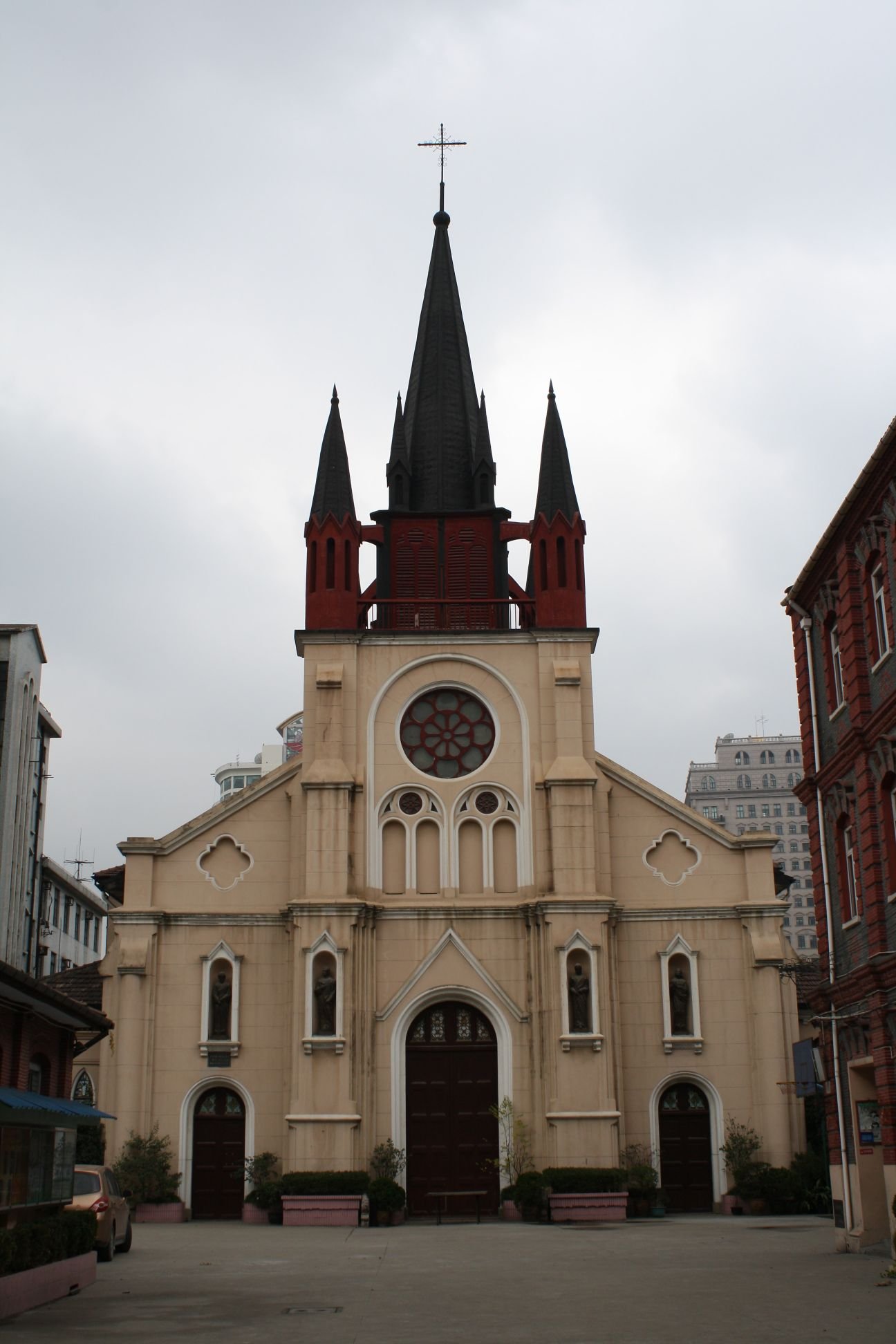
Saint Joseph's church in Shanghai

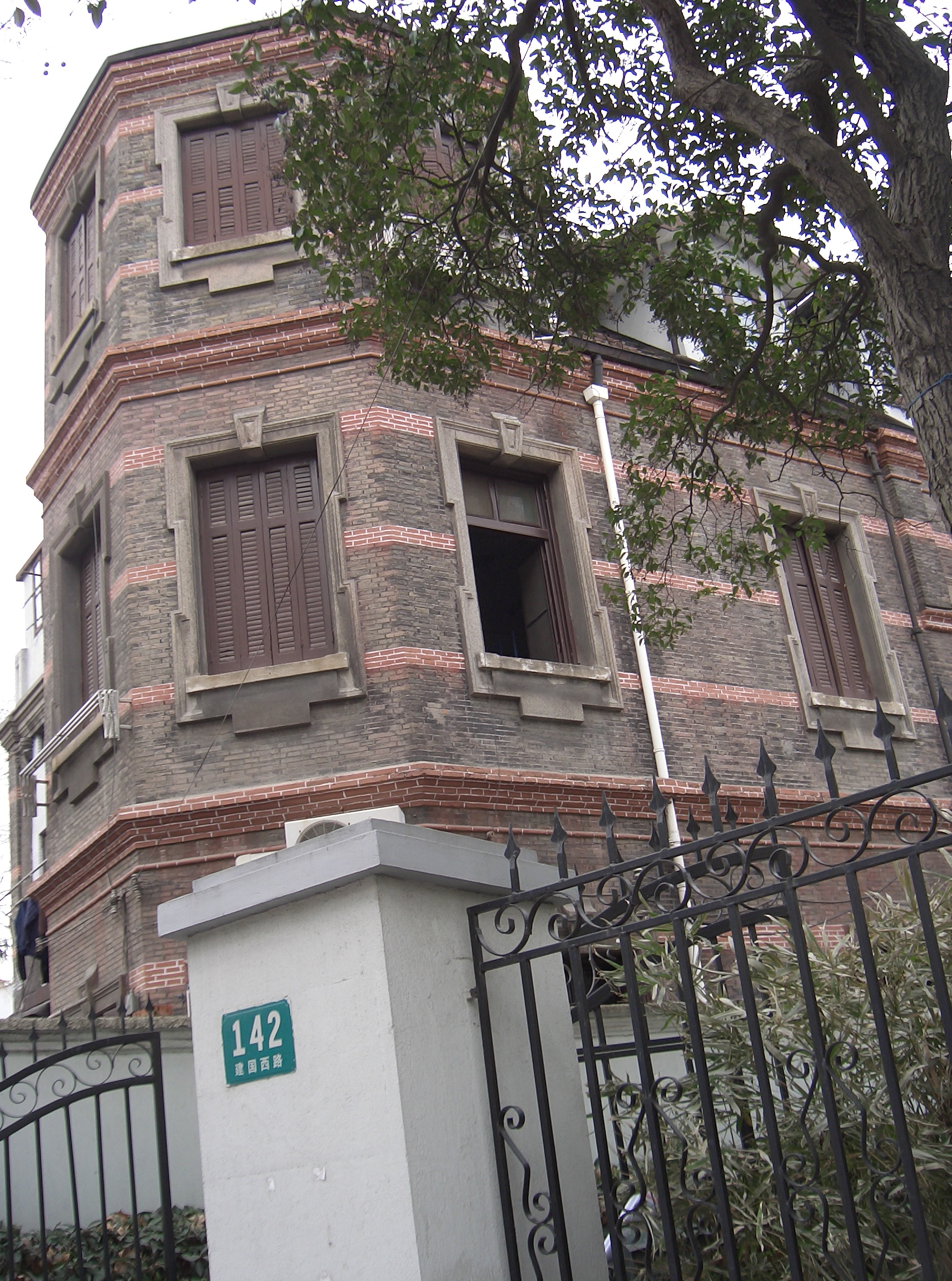
An apartment at No.142 West Jianguo Road, Shanghai

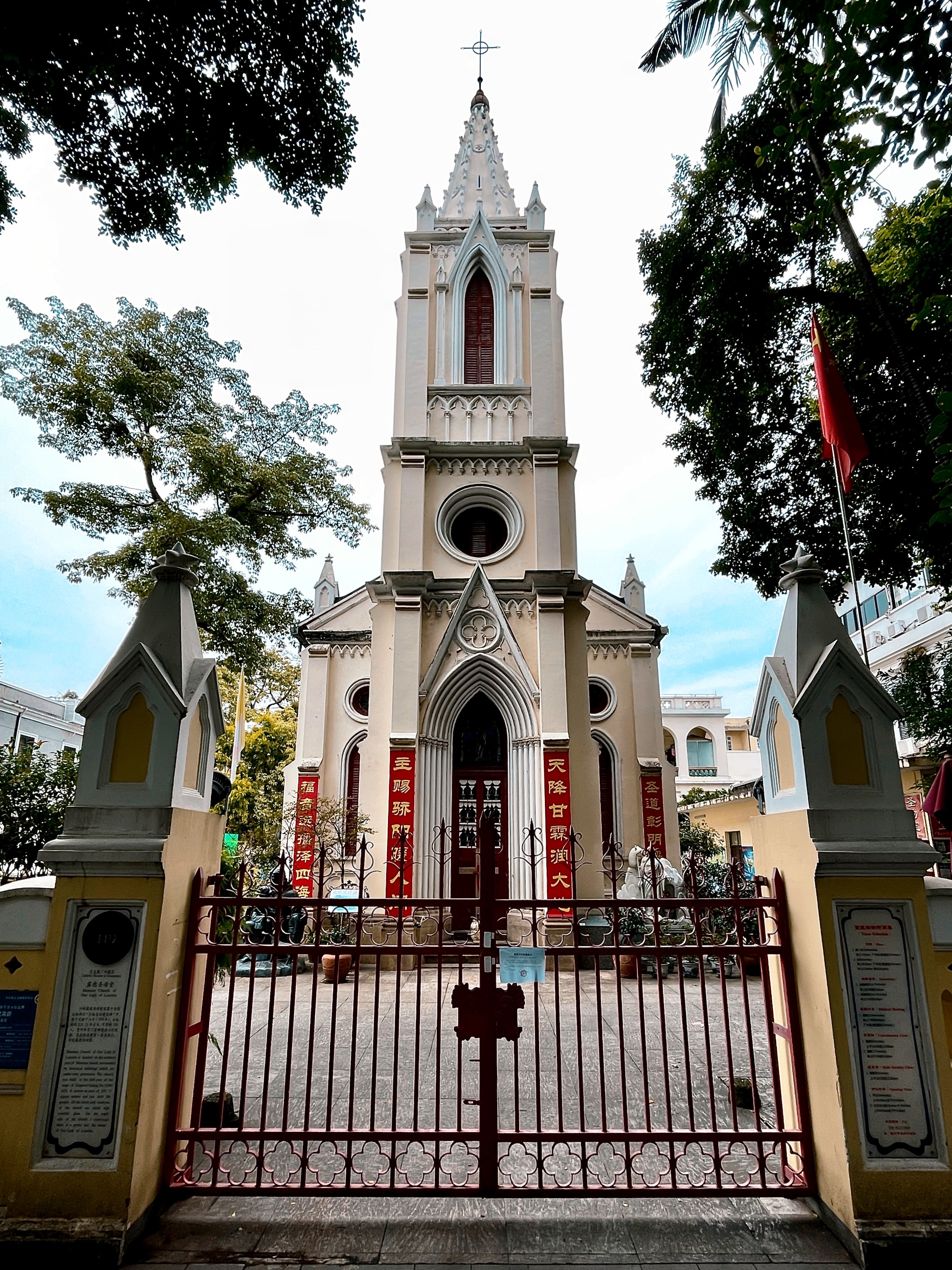
Our Lady of Lourdes Chapel, Shamian Island, Guangzhou

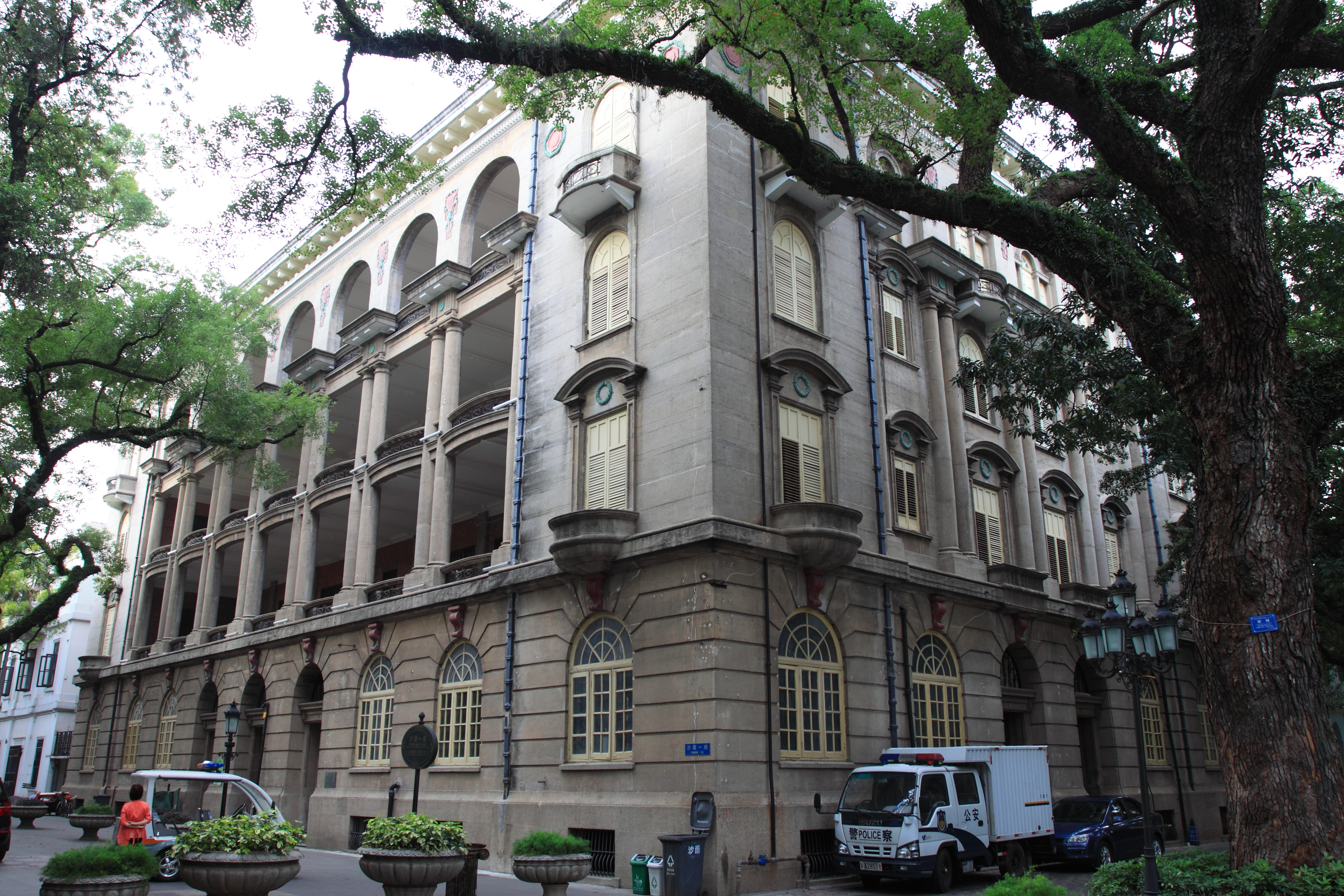
Banque de l'Indochine Building in Shamian Island, Guangzhou

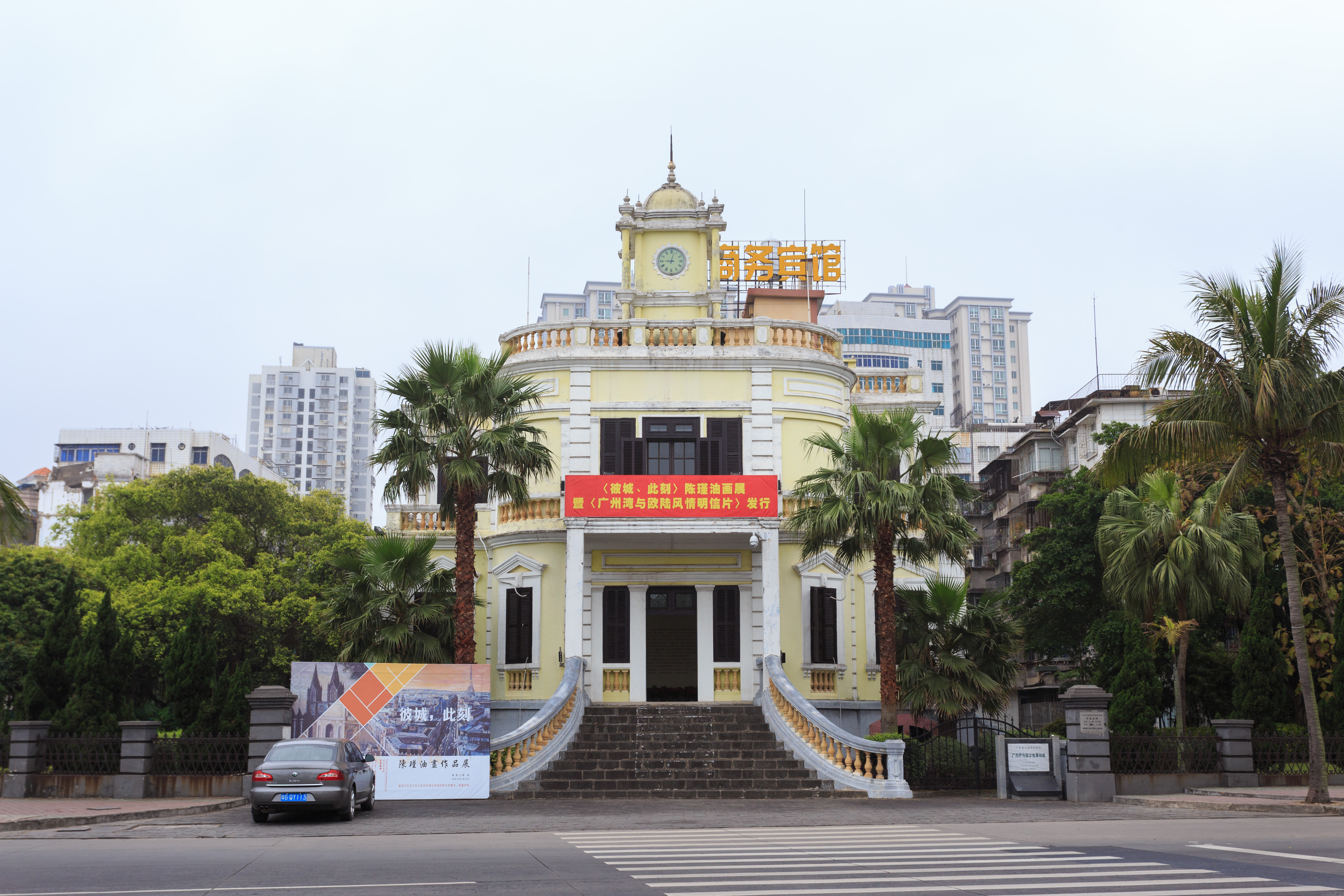
Former French Commissioner Residence in Zhanjiang

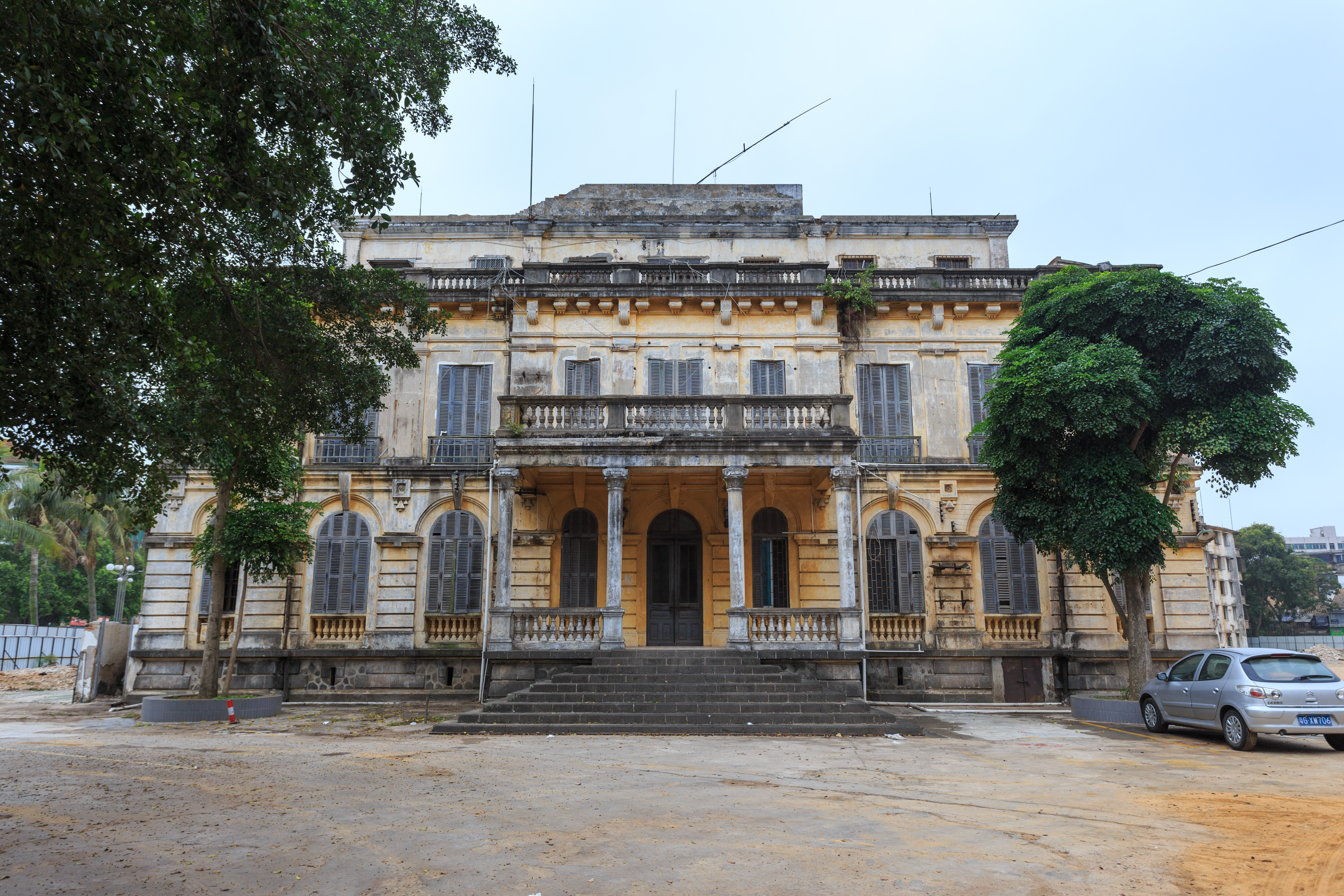
Former French Army Commandantura in Zhanjiang

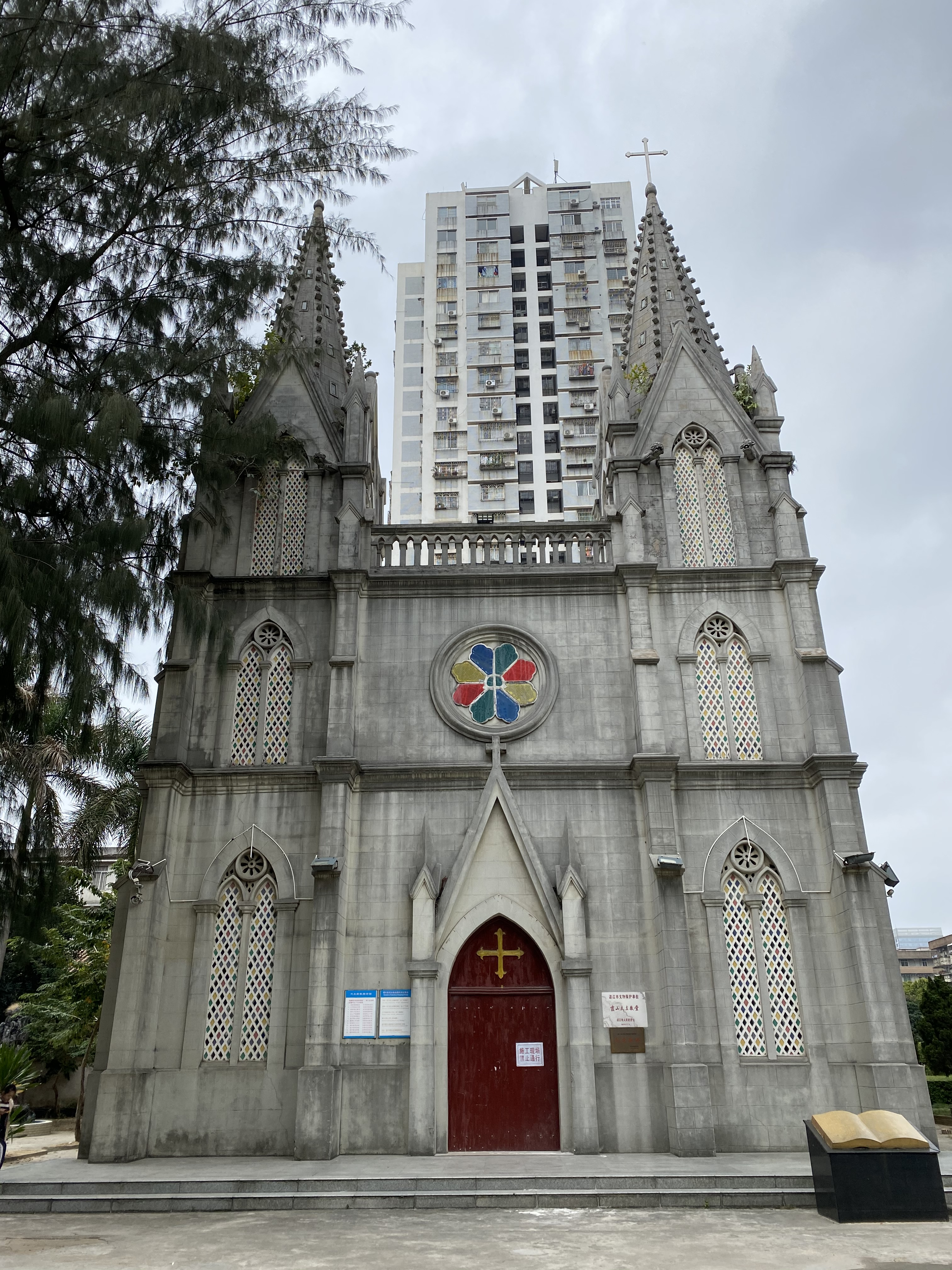
Our Lady of Victory Cathedral in Zhanjiang

=== Laos ===
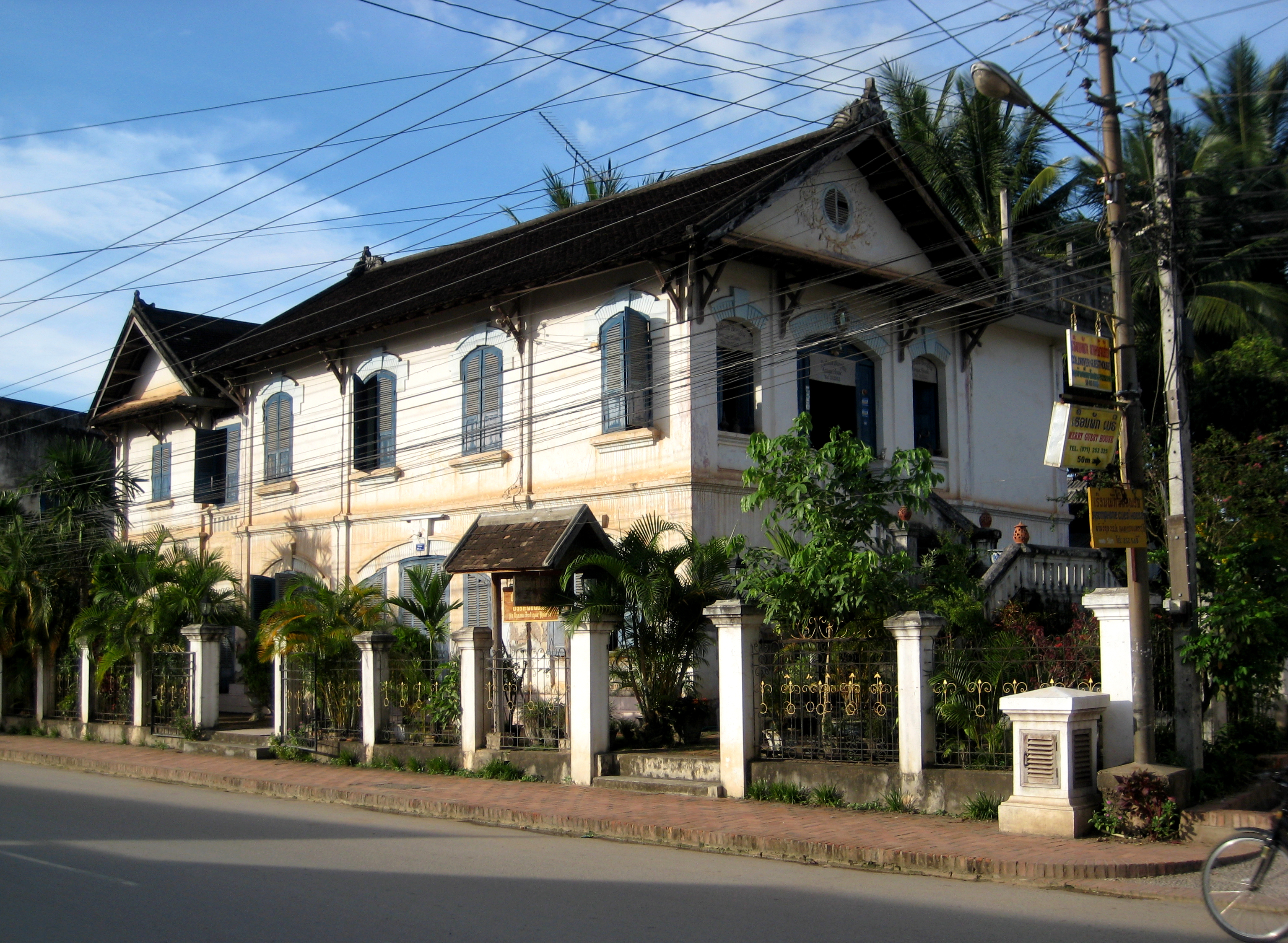
A typical colonial house in Luang Prabang

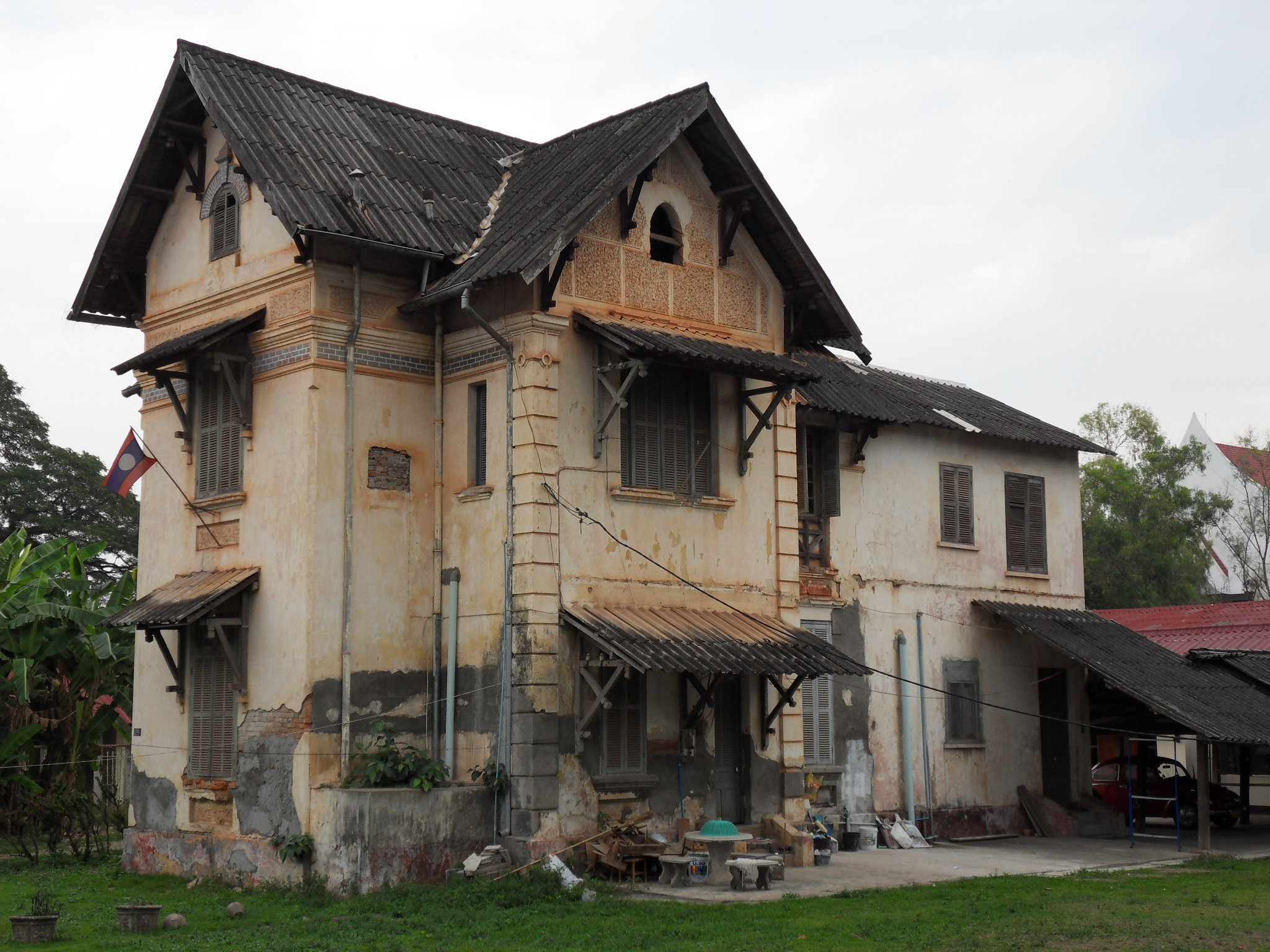
A French-style Arts and Crafts house in Vientiane

=== Vietnam ===
Various colonial buildings and constructions have become popular tourist destinations. Major landmarks that have become icons of cities including Hanoi and Ho Chi Minh City include:

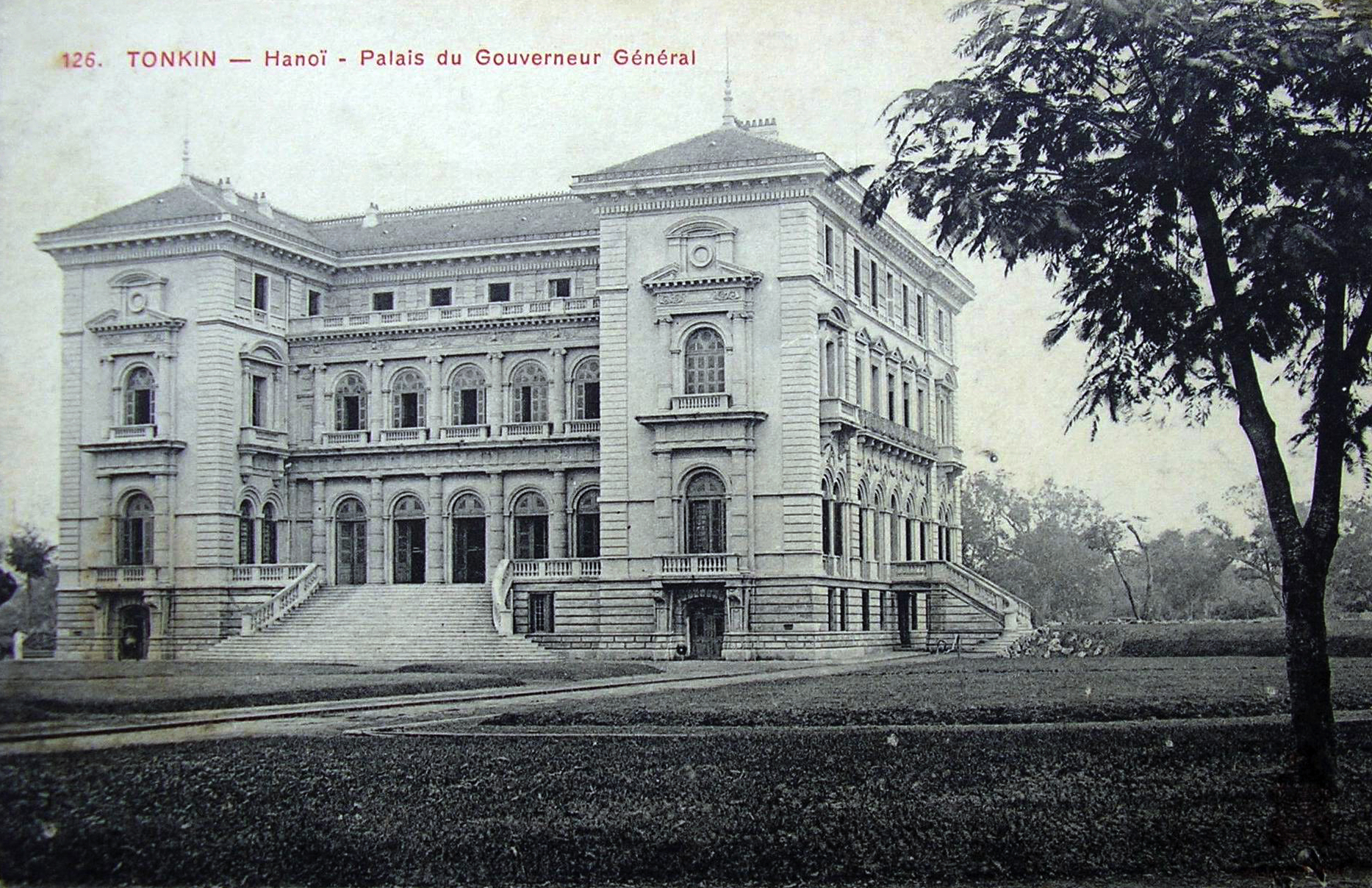
Hanoi, Presidential Palace

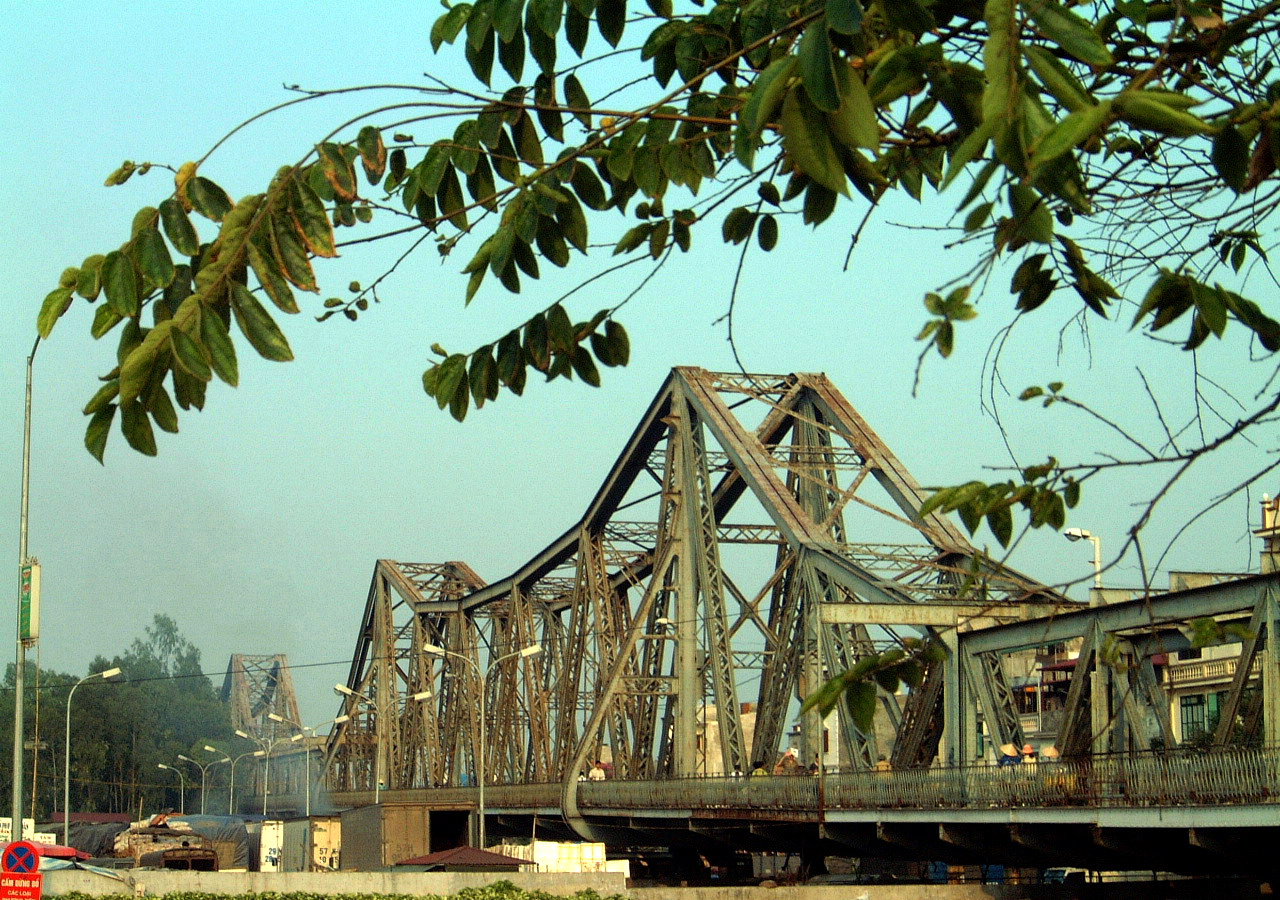
Hanoi, Long Biên Bridge

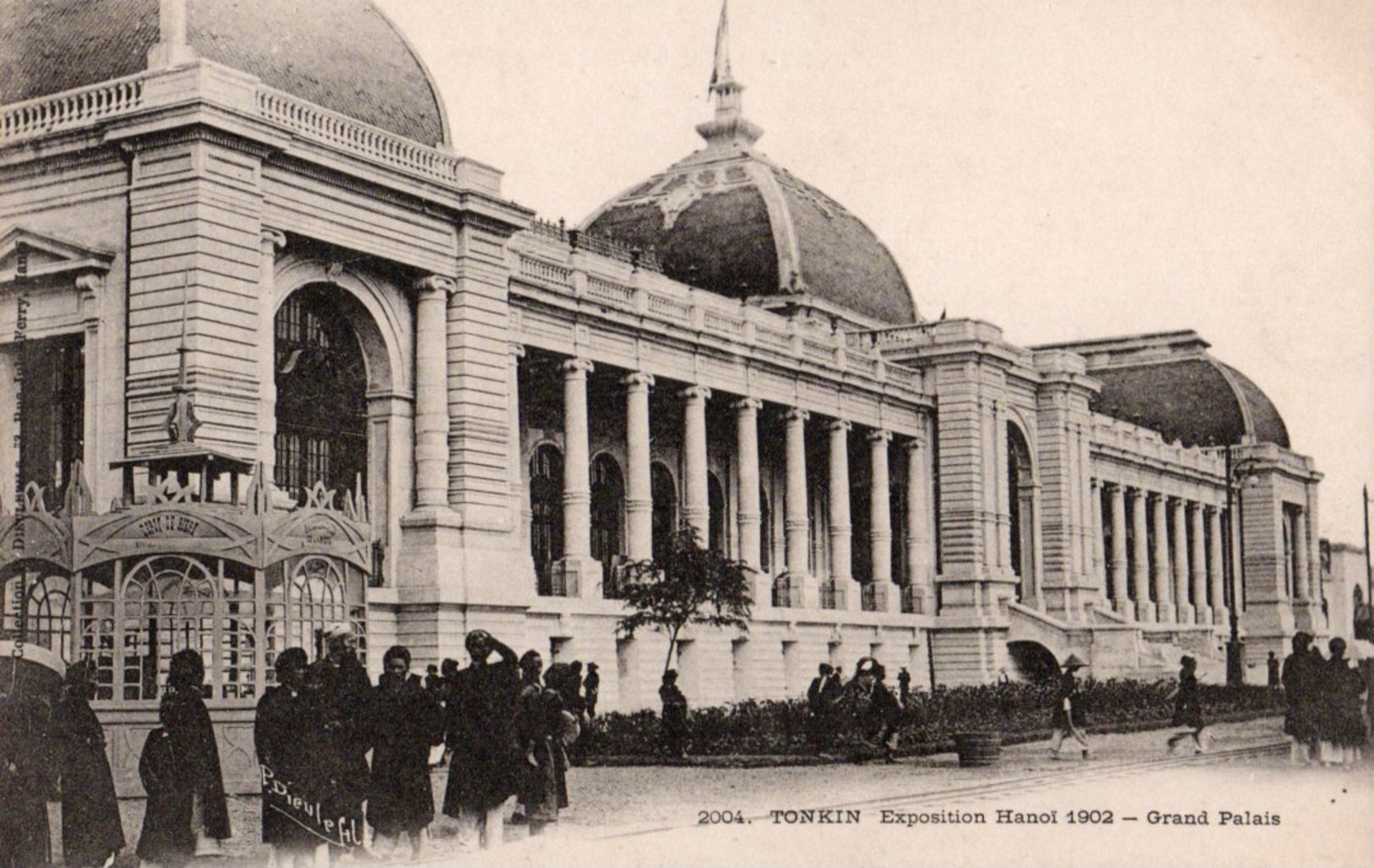
Hanoi, Grand Palais built for the Hanoi Exhibition 1902-1903, destroyed during WWII

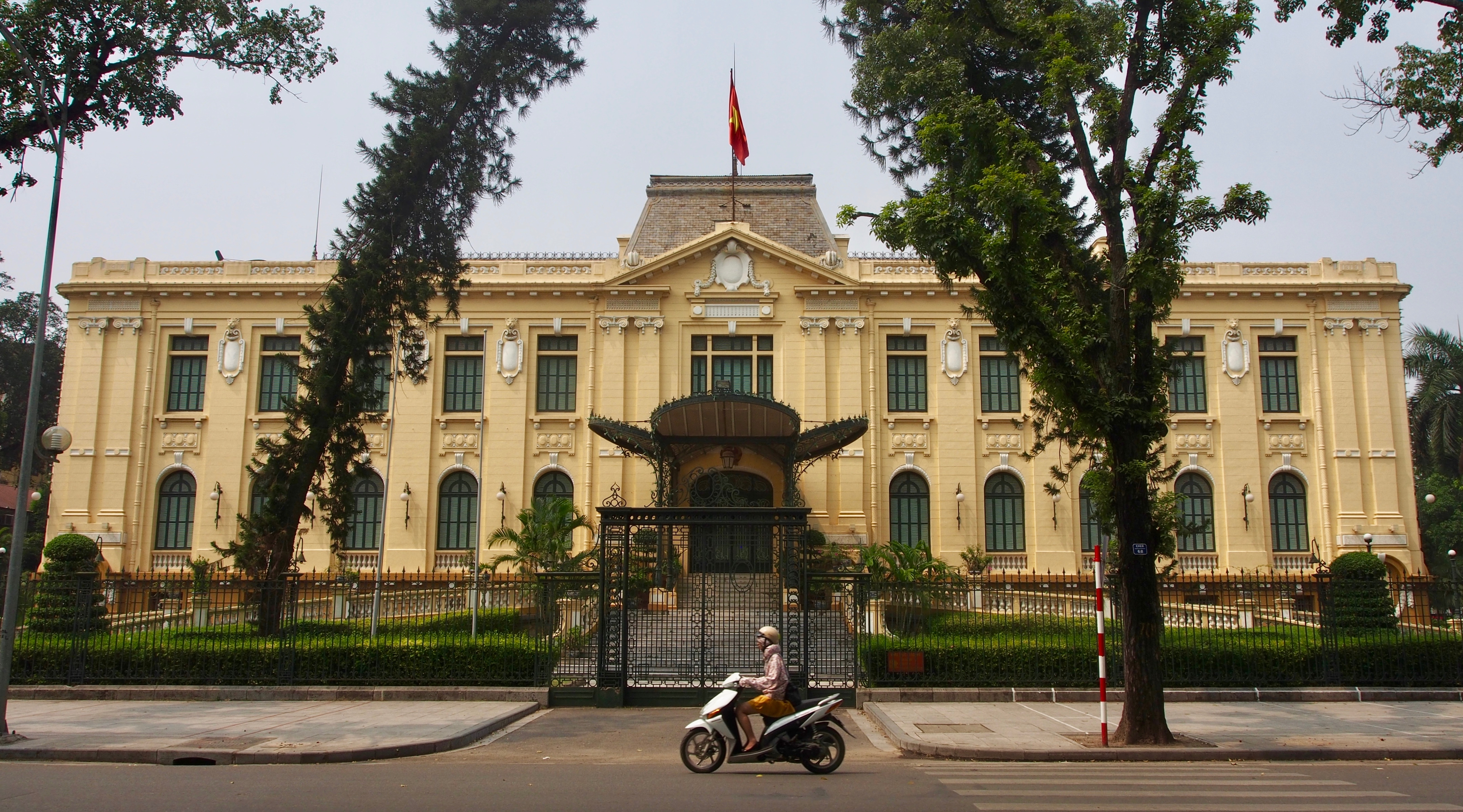
Hanoi, Tonkin Palace, formerly housing the French governor of Tonkin

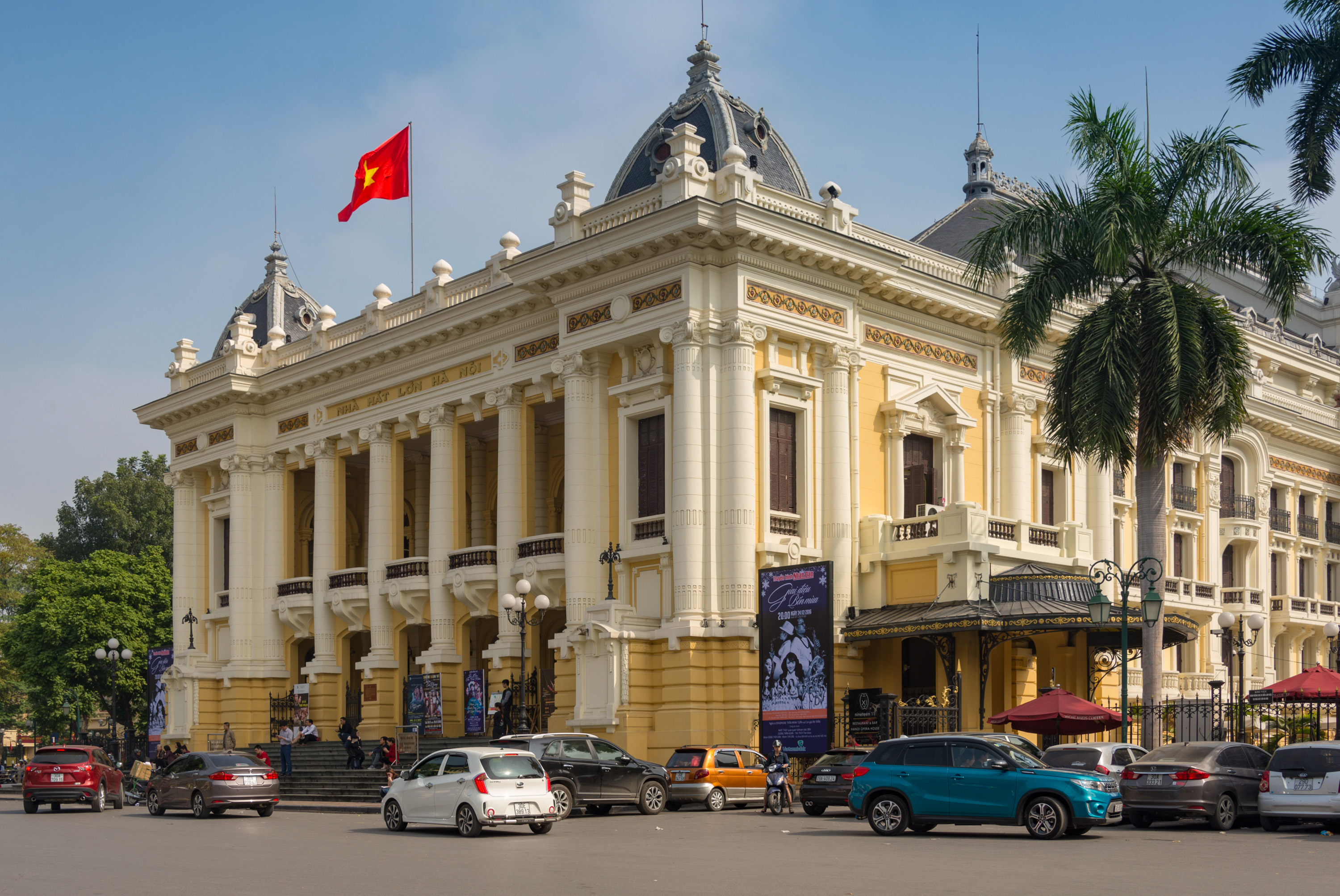
Hanoi Opera House modeled on the Palais Garnier in Hanoi

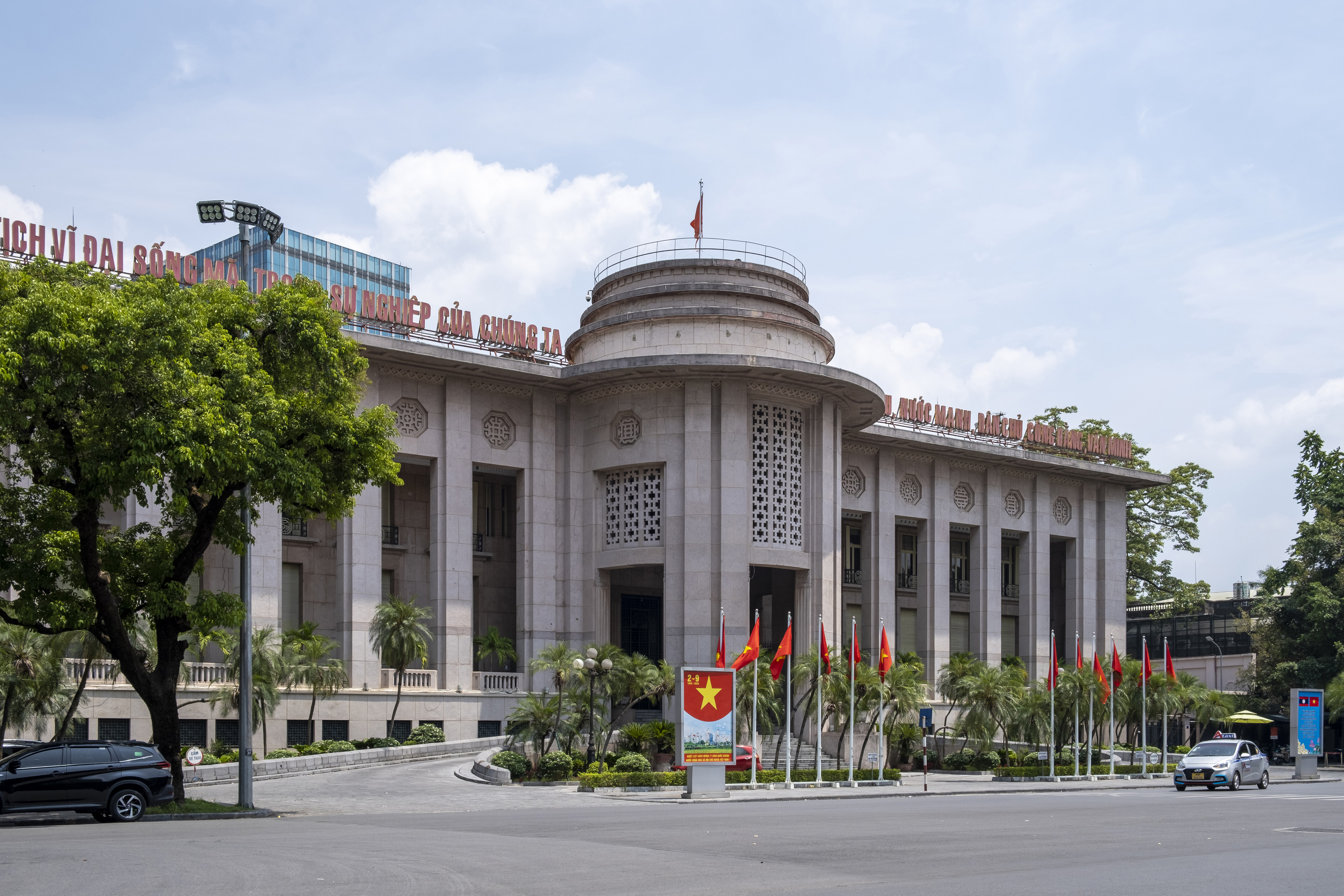
Hanoi, State Bank of Vietnam headquarters in art-deco style

Hanoi, National Museum of Vietnamese History, formerly the first École française d'Extrême-Orient

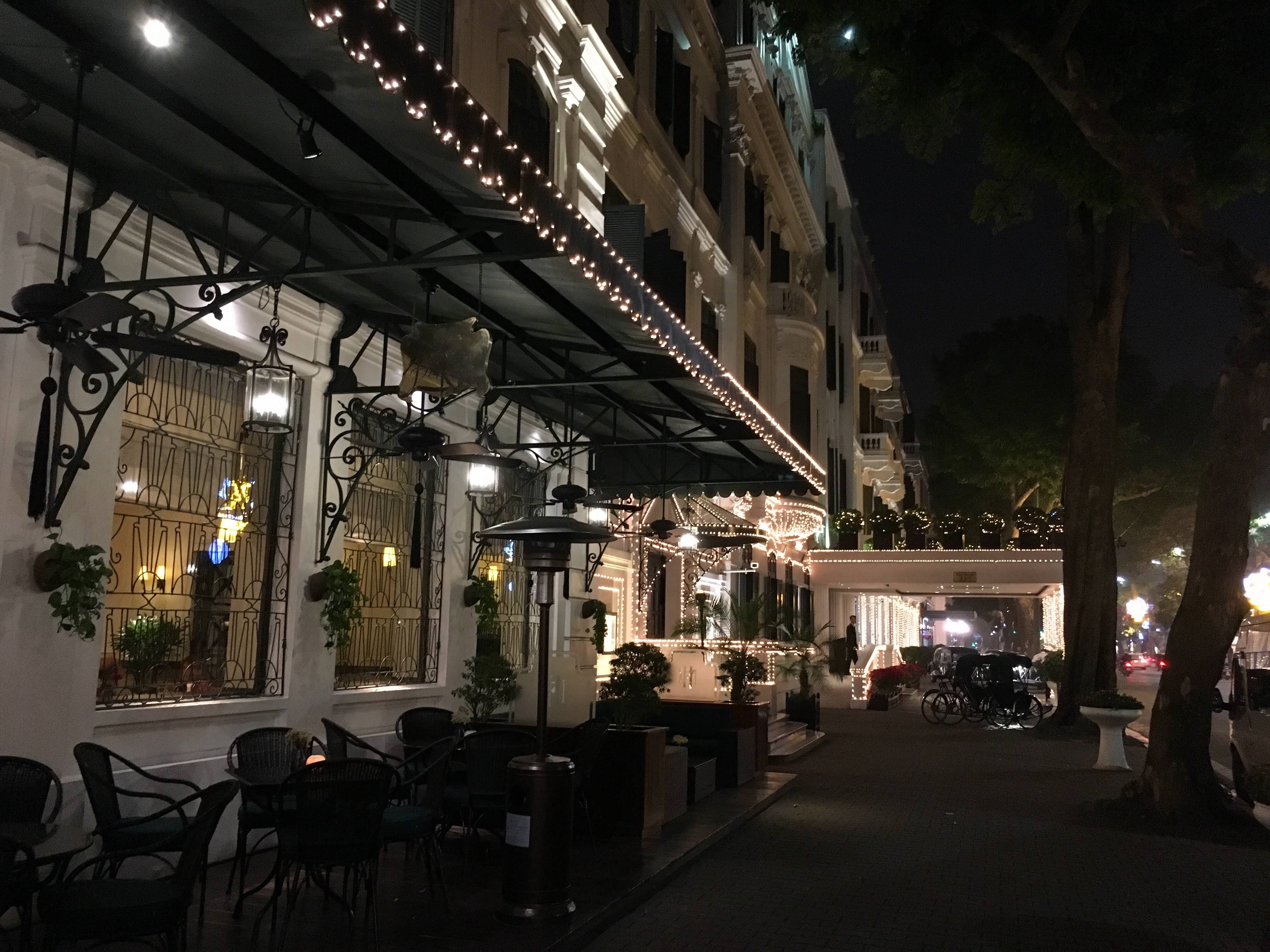
Hanoi, a corner of Hôtel Metropole

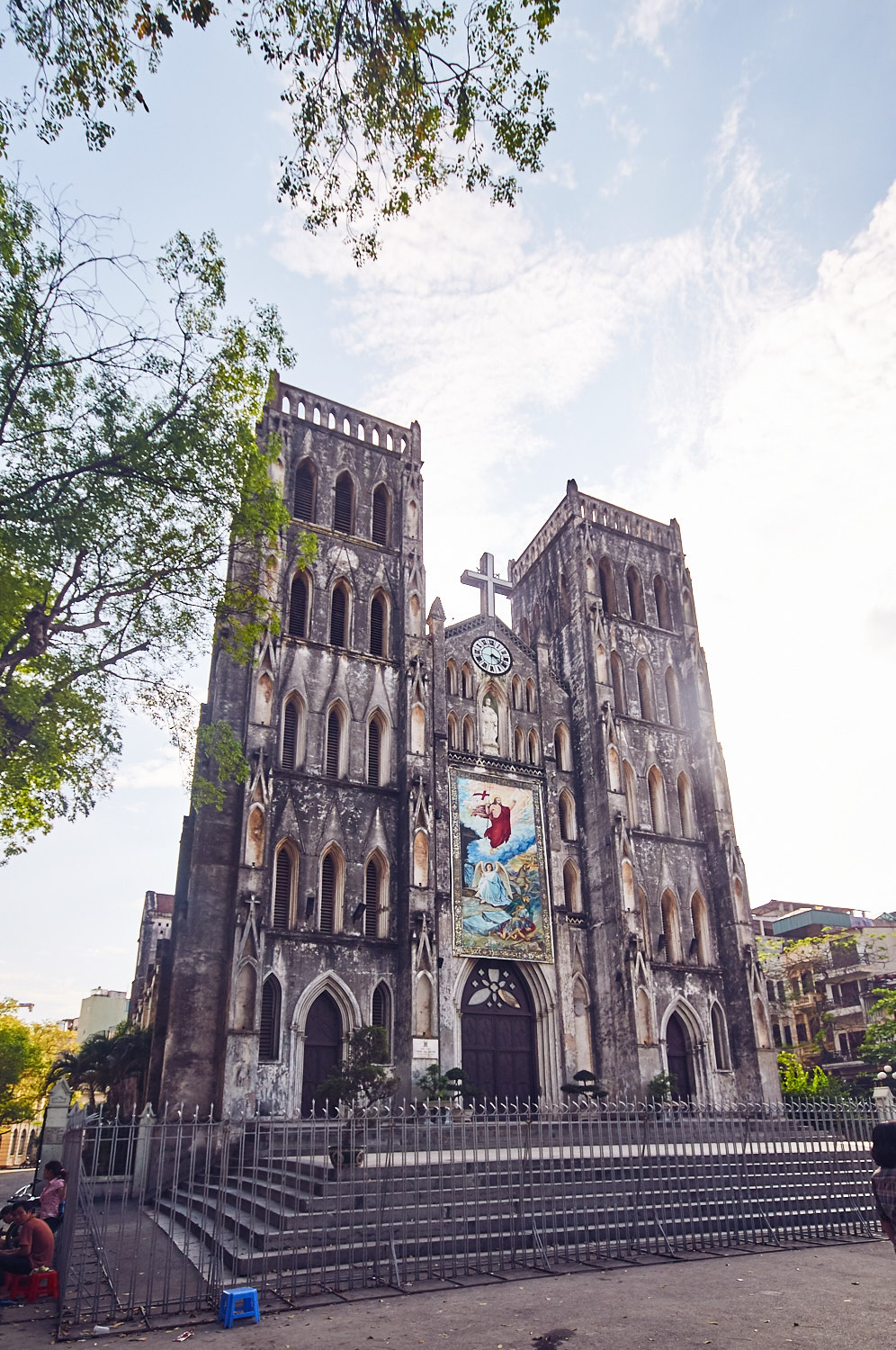
Hanoi, St. Joseph's Cathedral resembling Notre Dame de Paris

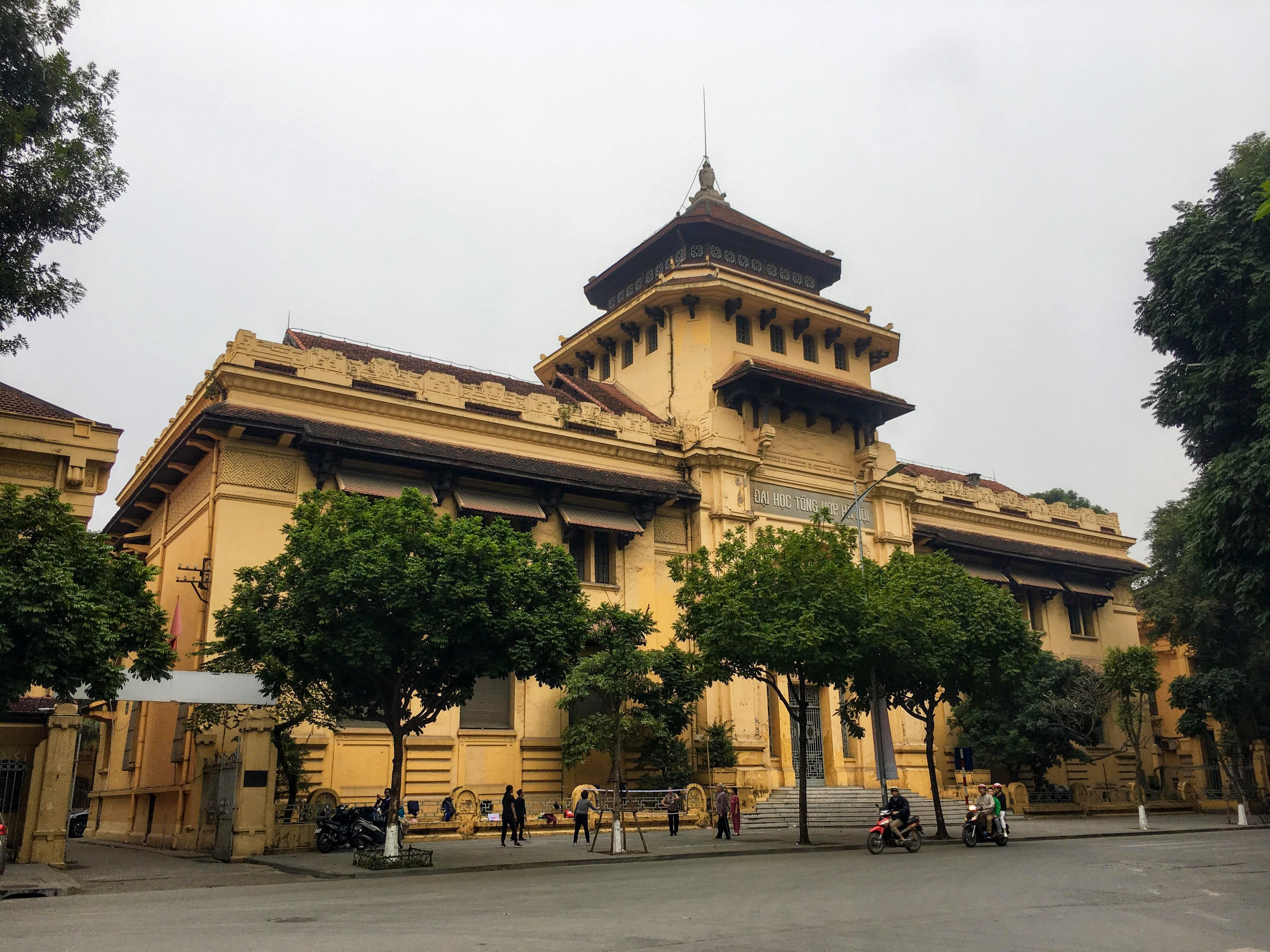
Hanoi, campus of Indochina Medical College and Université Indochinoise

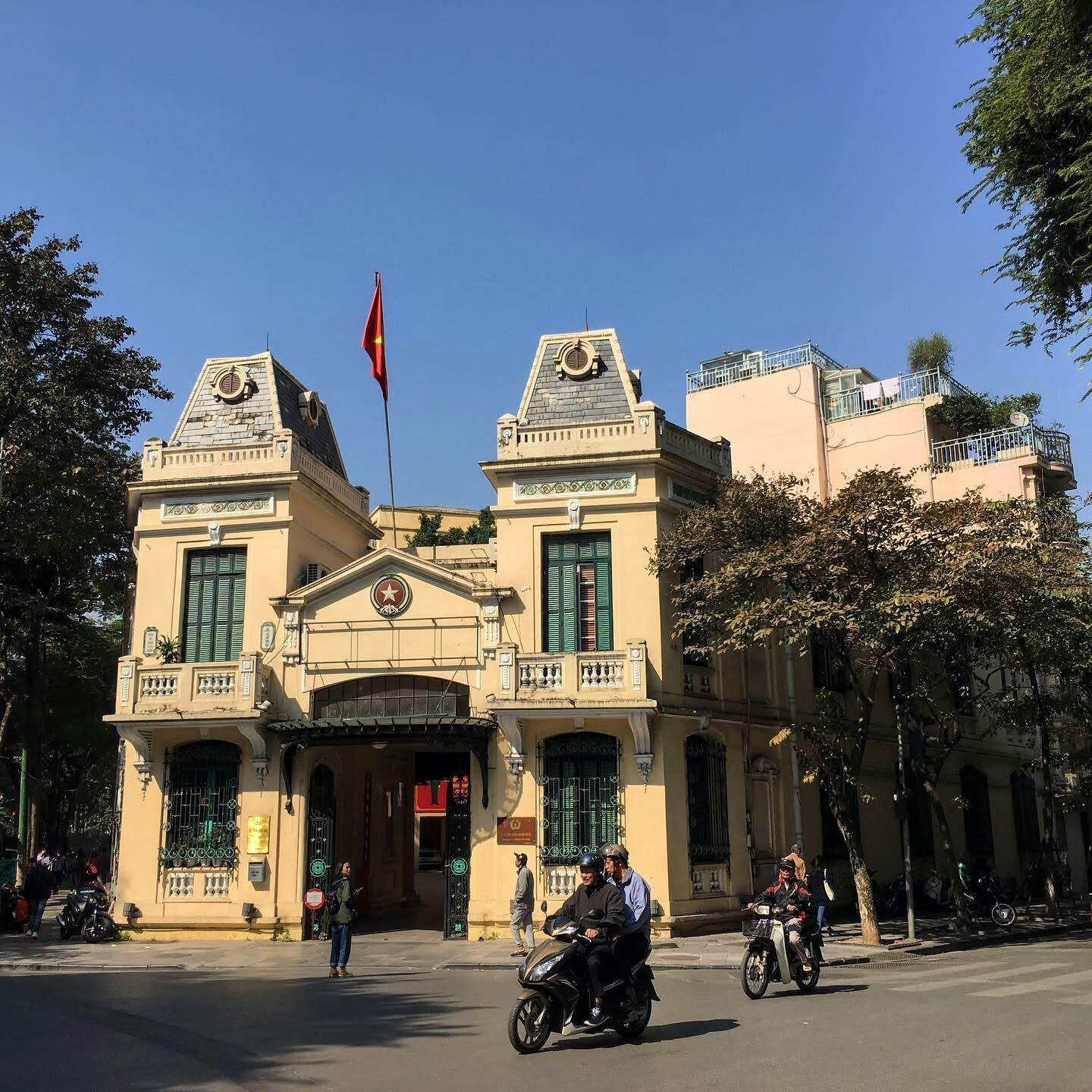
Hanoi, a local police station in a colonial building by Hoàn Kiếm lake

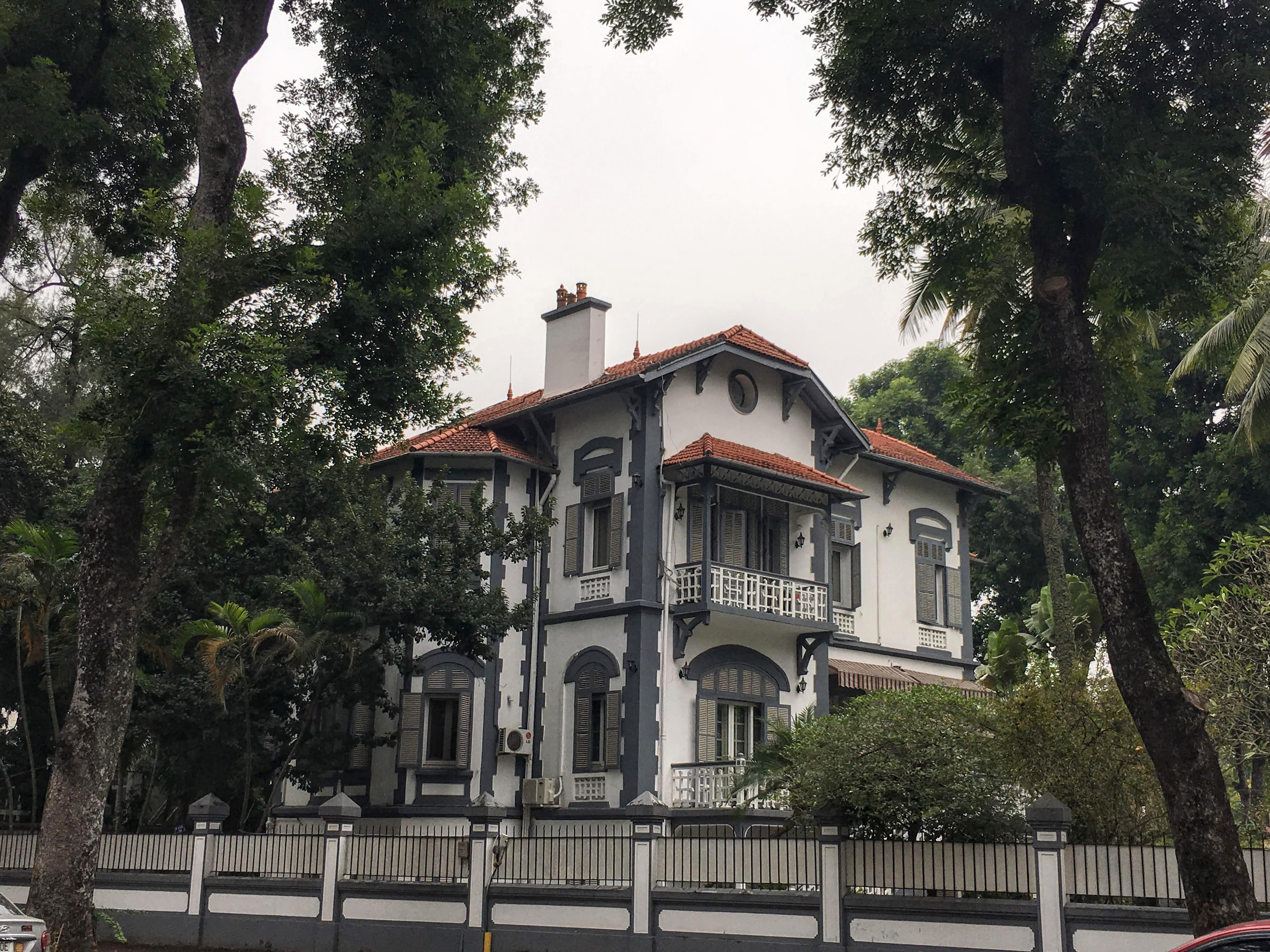
Hanoi, a French villa in Ba Đình District

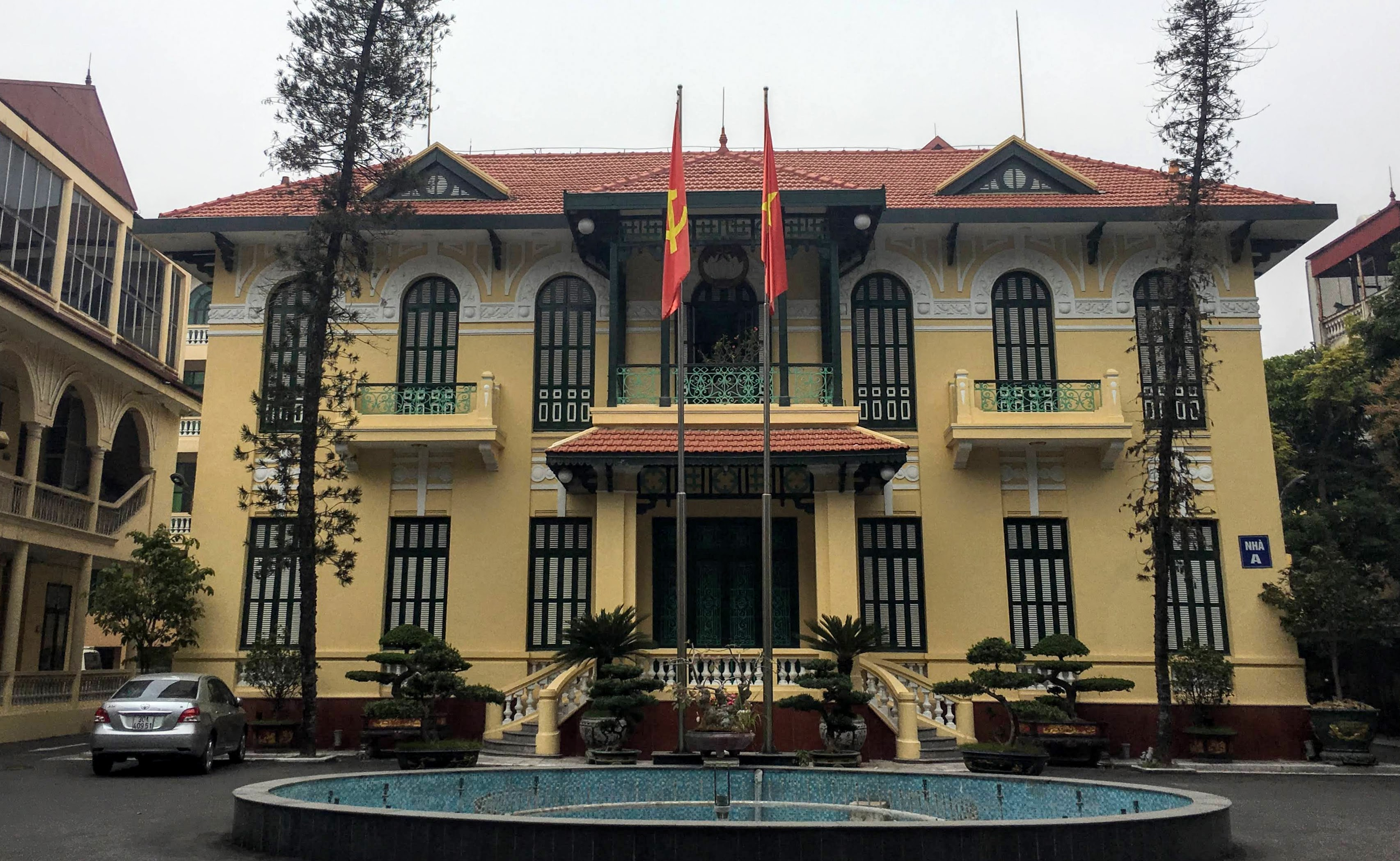
Hanoi, a government office (Fatherland Front HQ)

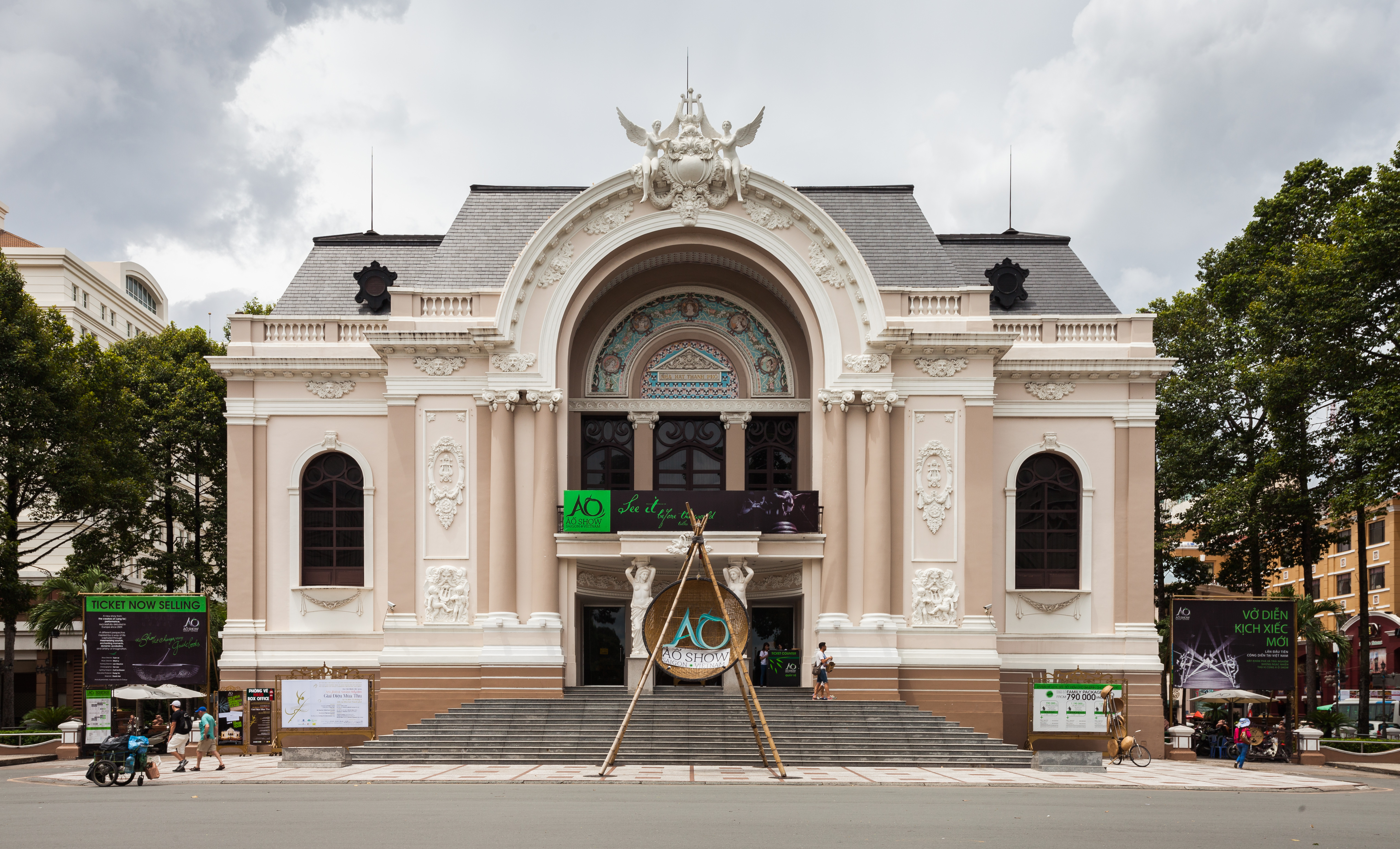
Ho Chi Minh City, Municipal Theatre

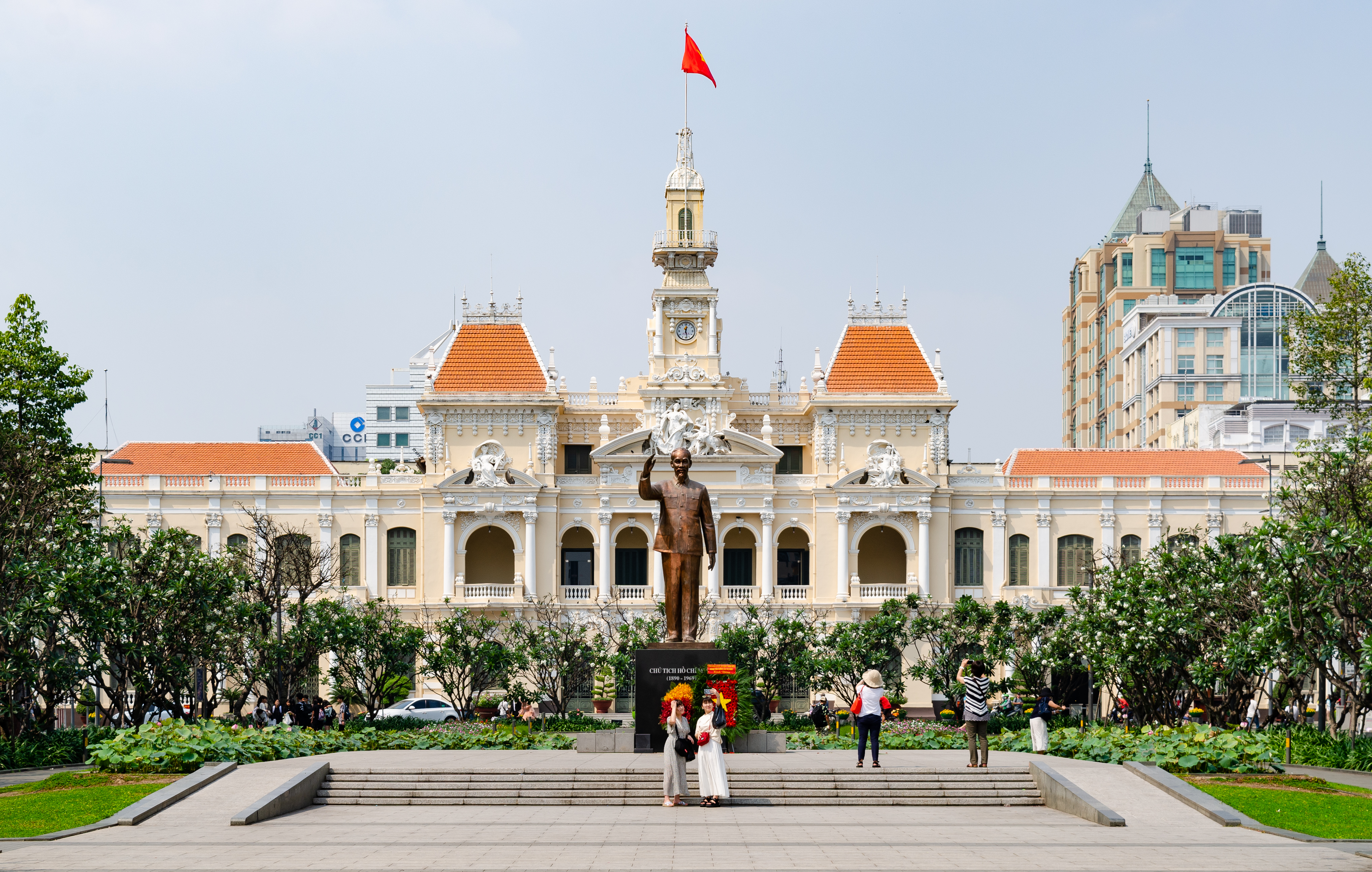
Ho Chi Minh City Hall

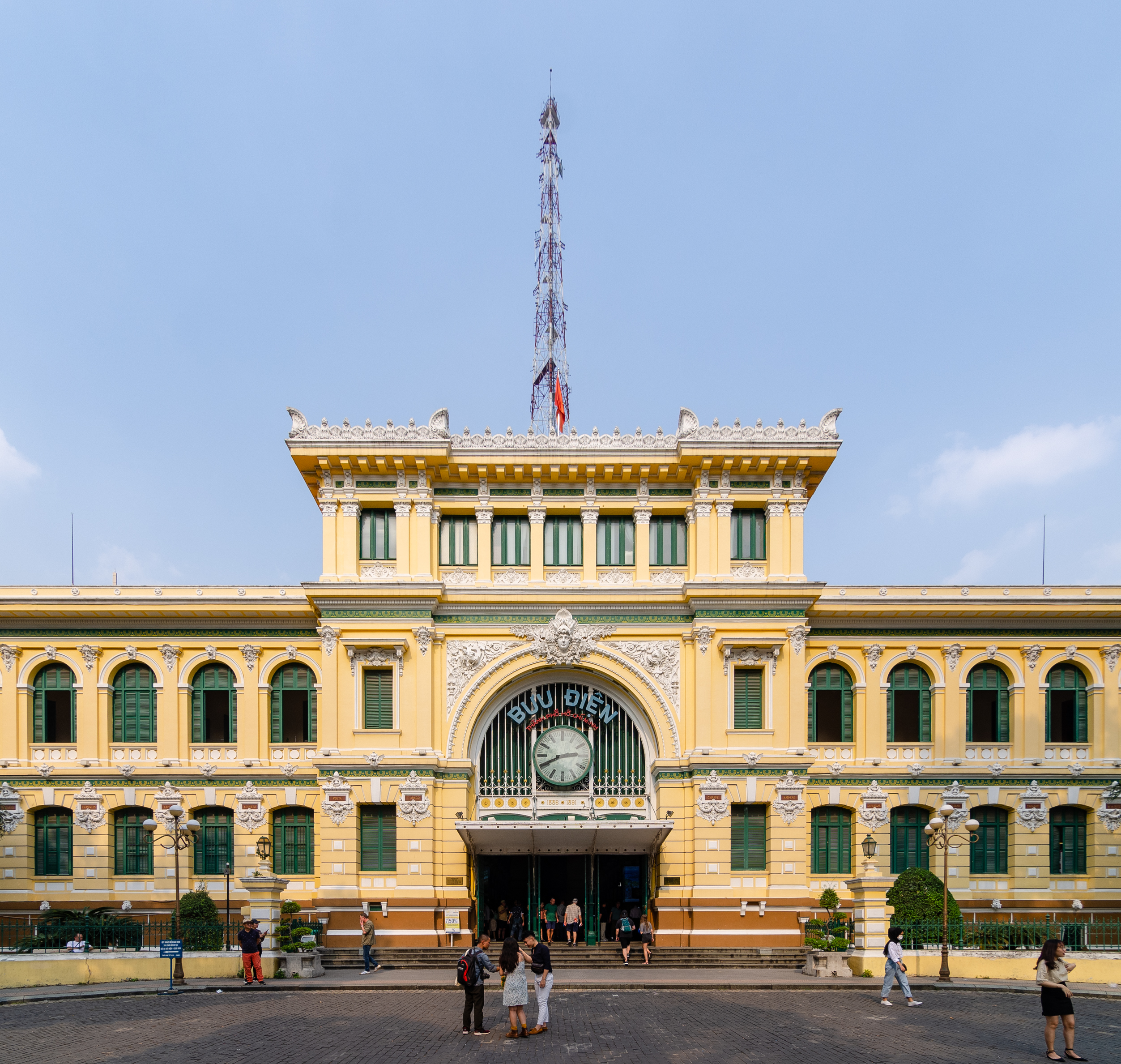
Ho Chi Minh City, Central Post Office

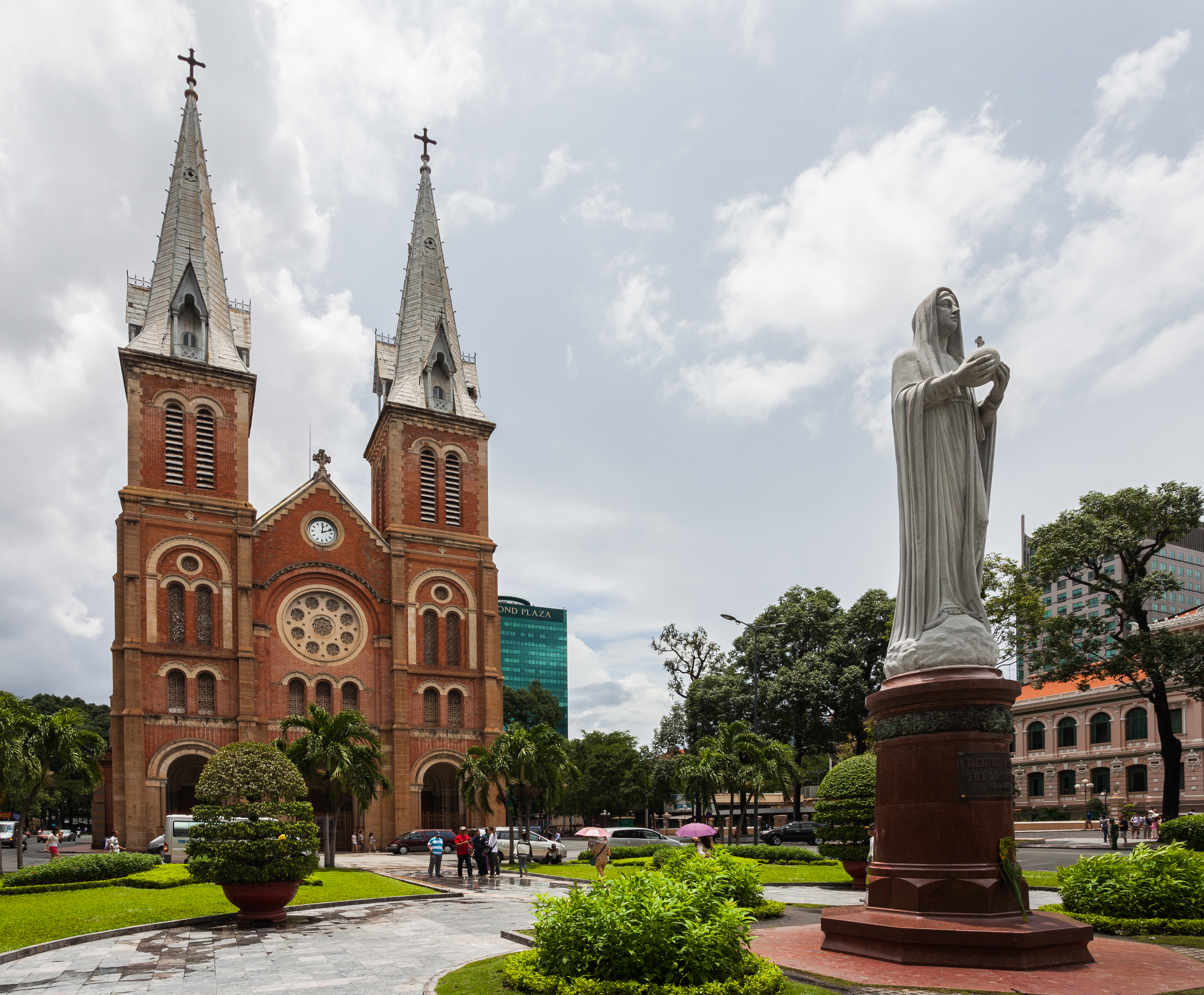
Ho Chi Minh City, Notre-Dame Cathedral Basilica

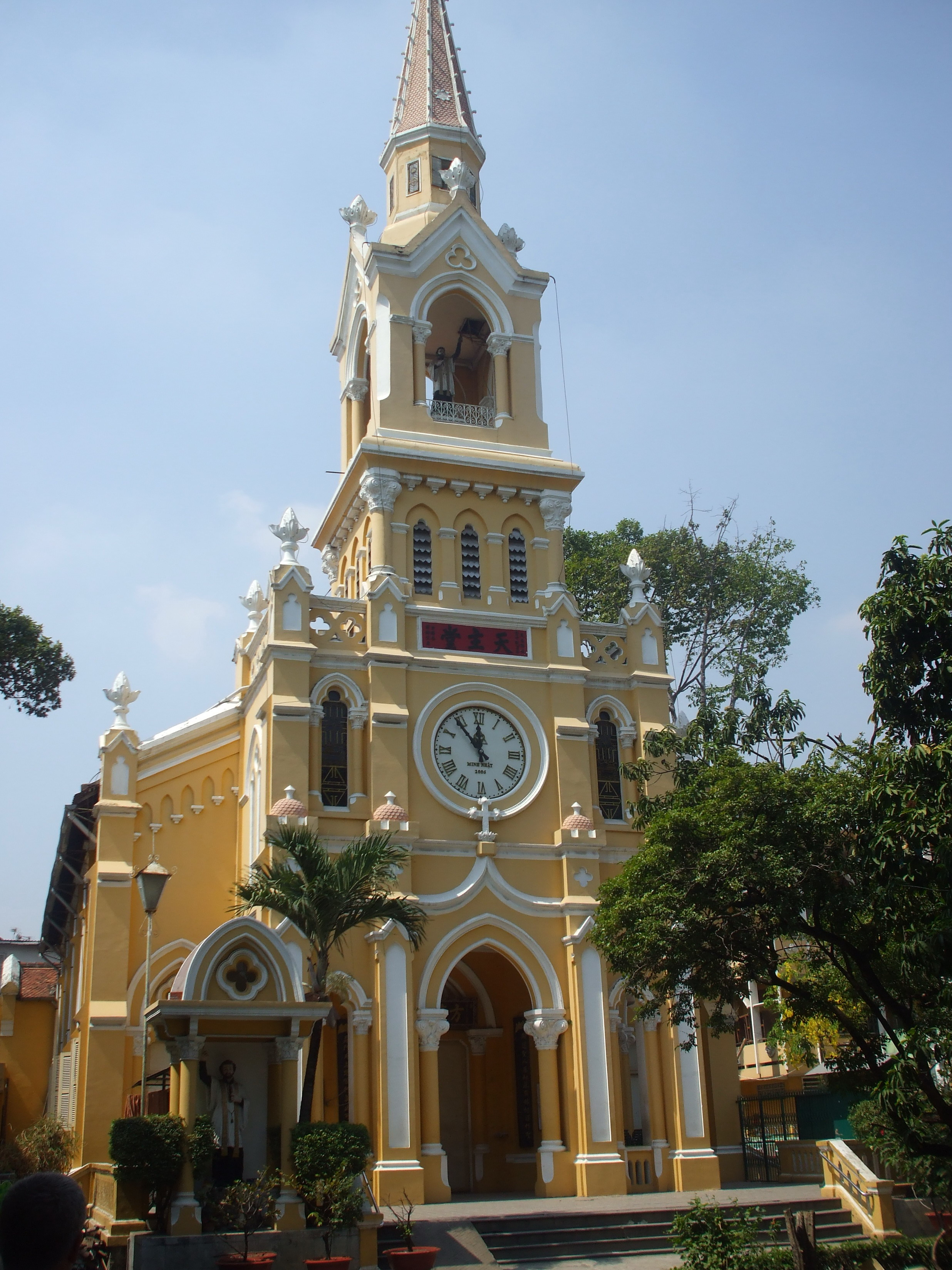
Ho Chi Minh City, Saint Francis Xavier's Church

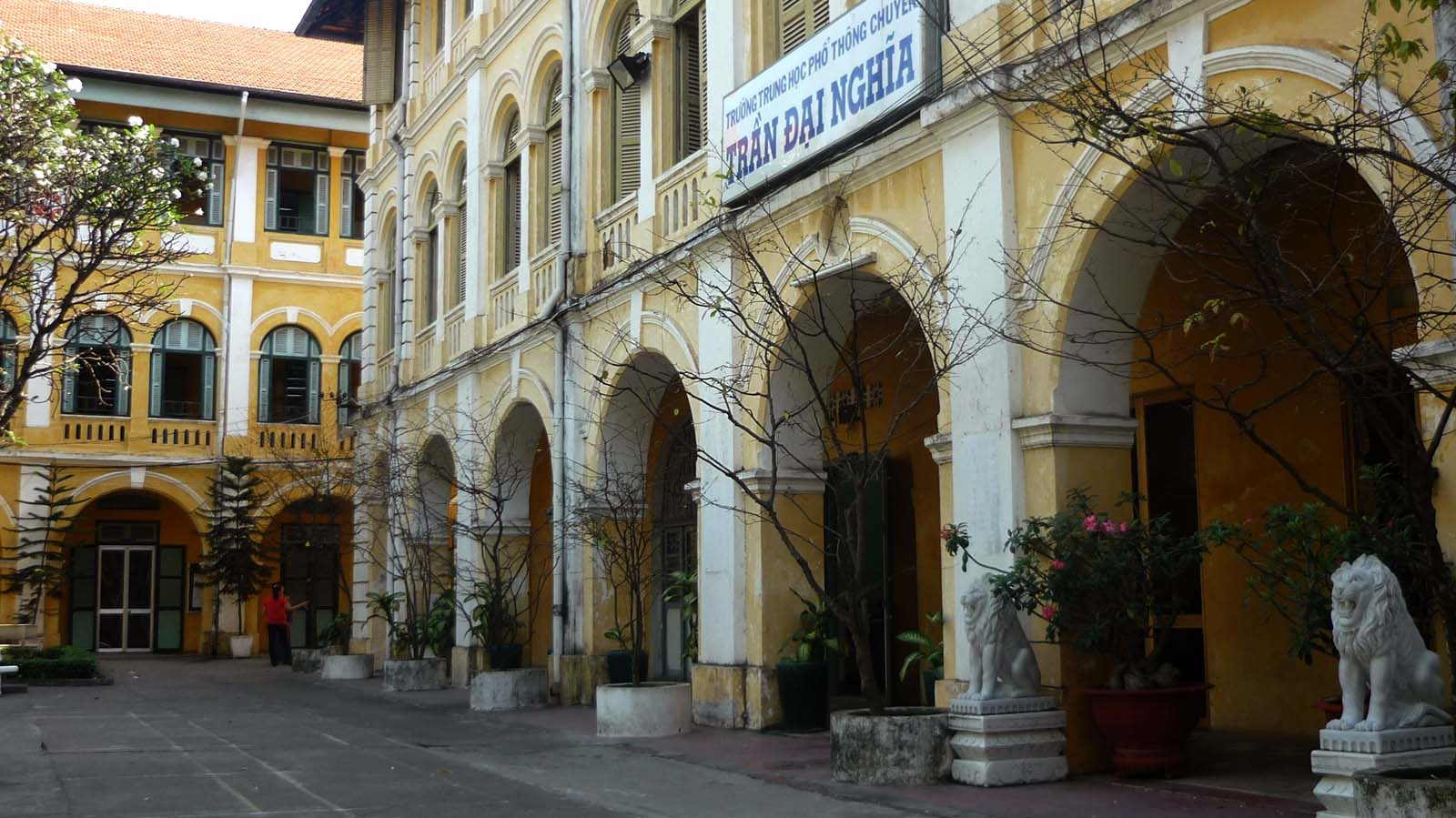
Ho Chi Minh City, Trần Đại Nghĩa High School for the Gifted

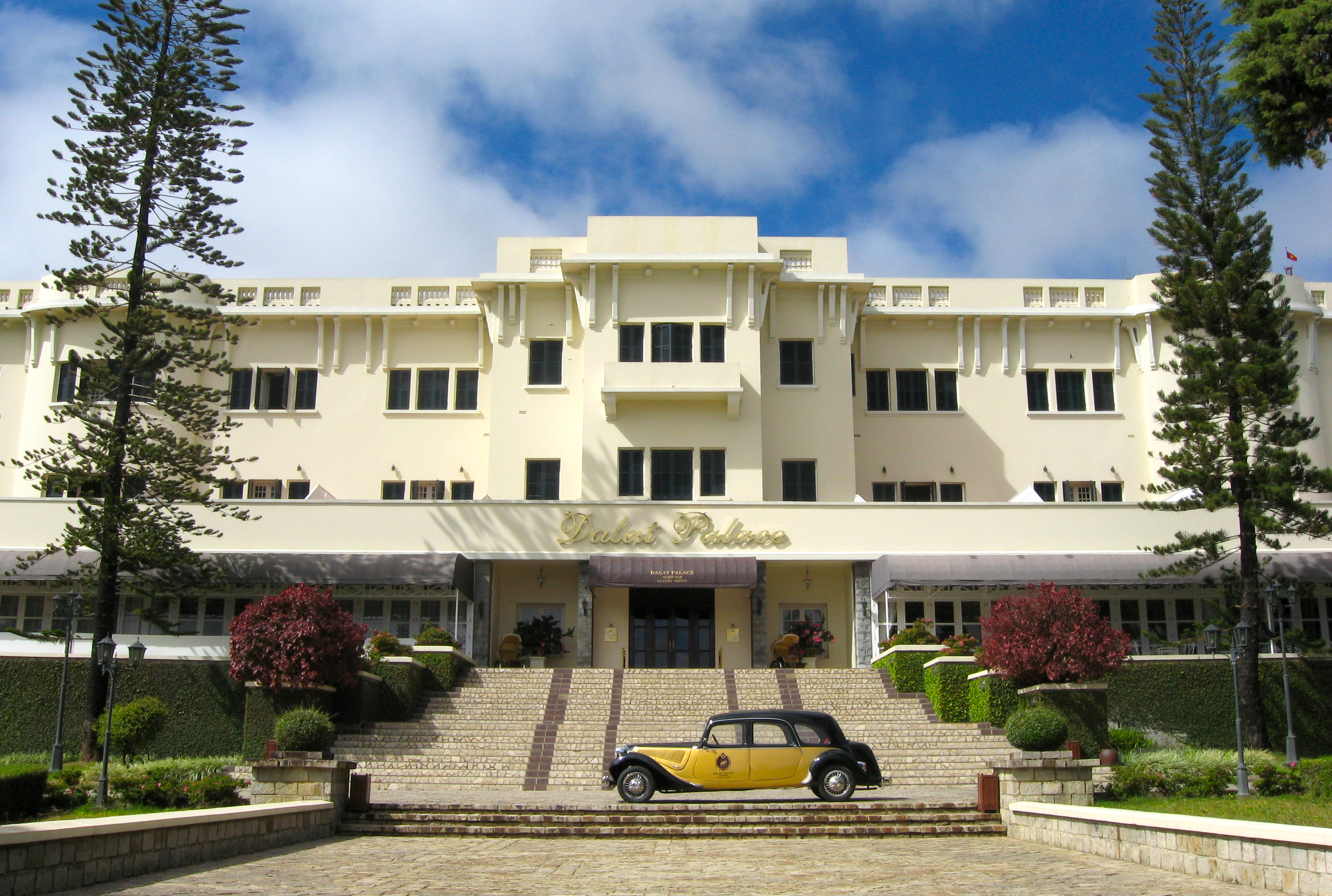
Dalat Palace Hotel

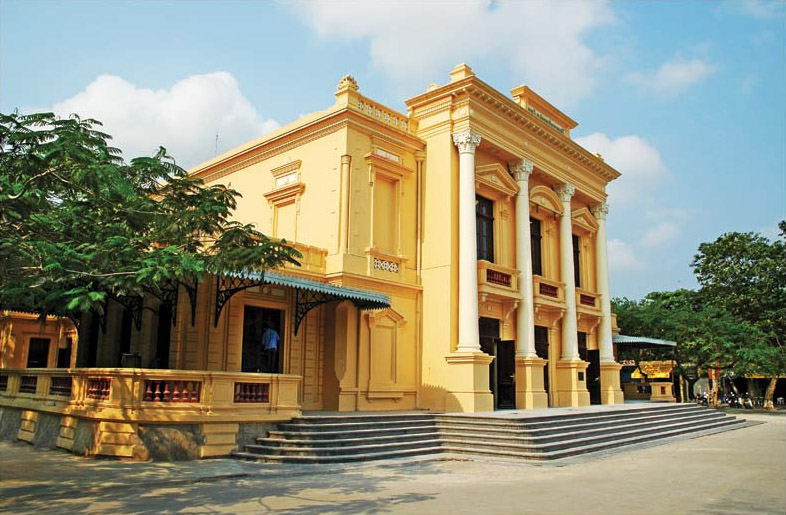
Haiphong Opera House

== In North America ==
=== Canada ===
French settlements in Canada date back to the mid-16th century until the French defeat in Seven Years' War where New France was annexed by the British Crown in 1763 as a result of the Treaty of Paris. The settlements in the regions were extensive, hence the abundant architectural legacy from that period shows itself particularly in Quebec City but also in the city of Montreal, which has a significant Canadien population. Most buildings constructed during the French colonial period utilized a heavy timber frame of logs installed vertically on a sill, poteaux-sur-sol, or into the earth, poteaux-en-terre. An infill of lime mortar or clay mixed with small stones (pierrotage) or a mixture of mud, moss, and animal hair (bousillage) was used to pack between the logs. Many times the infill would later be replaced with brick. This method of construction was used in the Illinois Country as well as Louisiana. General characteristics of a French Colonial dwelling included a raised basement which would support the floor of the home's primary living quarters. Exterior stairs were another common element; the stairs would often climb up to a distinctive, full-length veranda or "gallery", on a home's façade. The roof over the veranda was normally part of the overall roof. French Colonial roofs were either a steep hipped roof, with a dormer or dormers, or a side-gabled roof. The veranda or gallery was often accessed via French doors. French Colonial homes in the American South commonly had stuccoed exterior walls.

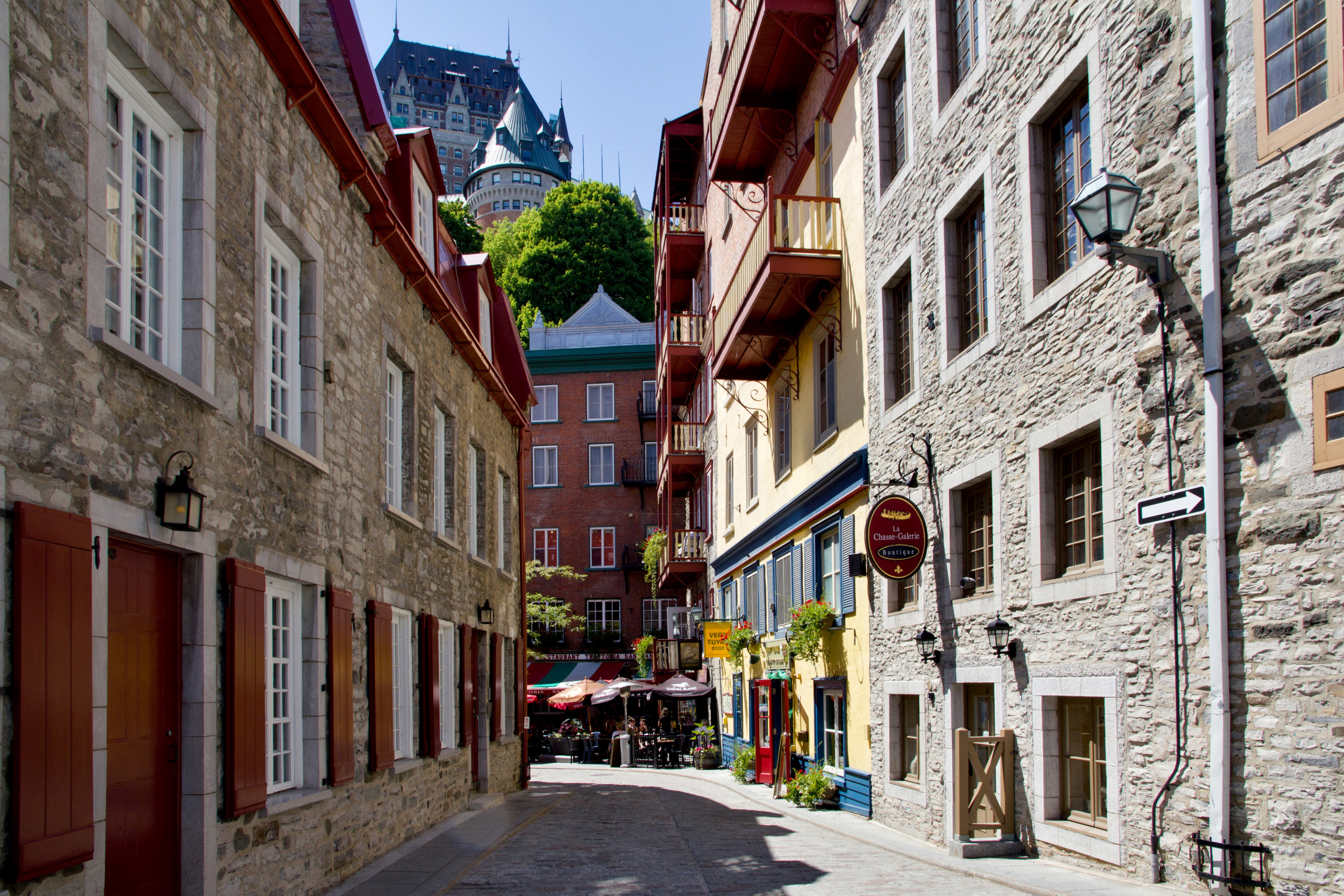
Quebec City presents probably the finest example of urban colonial architecture in North America

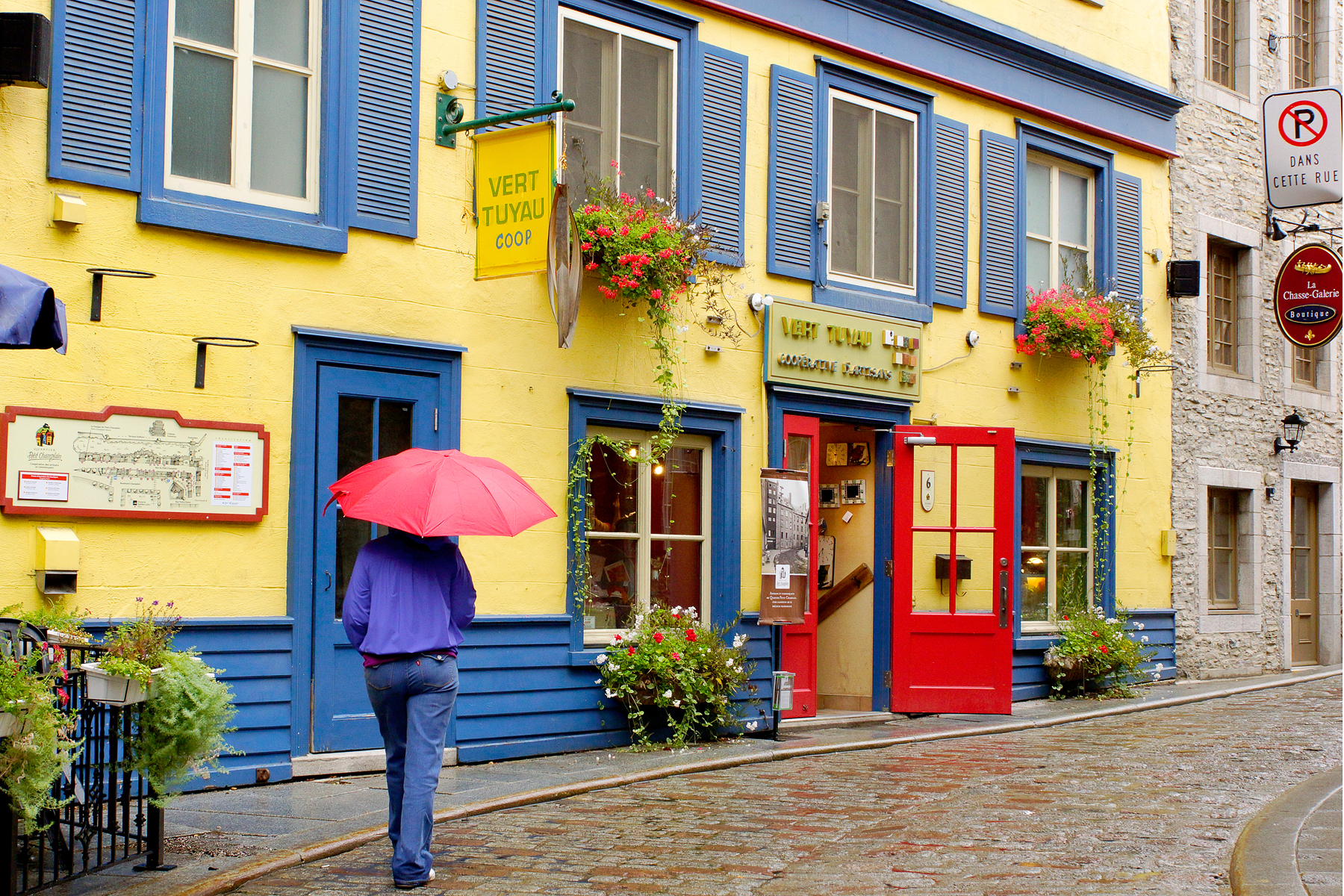
Old Quebec (City) was listed as a UNESCO Heritage Site in 1985

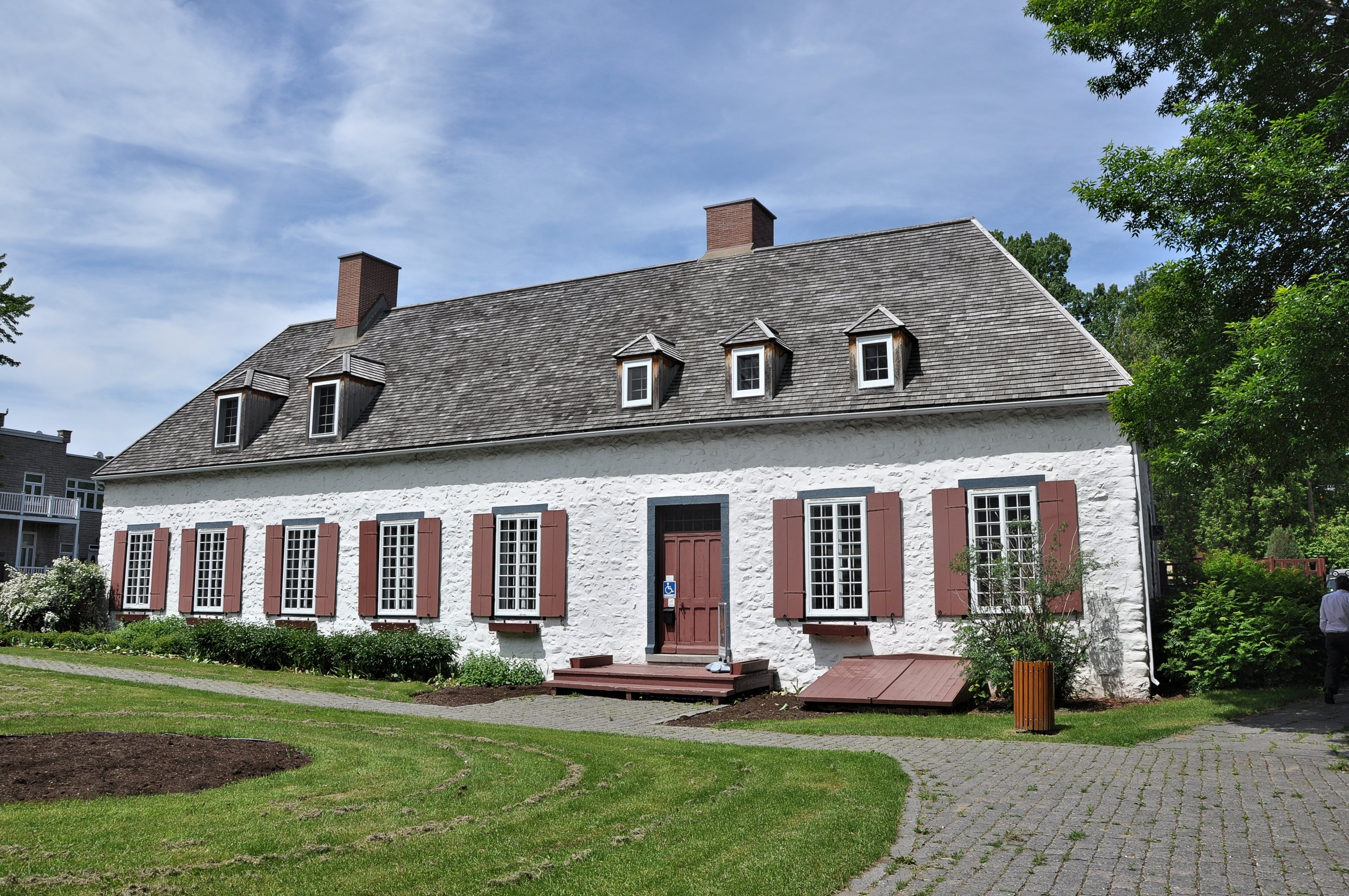
The manoir Boucher-De Niverville, located in Trois-Rivières, in Quebec province was built in the mid-17th century

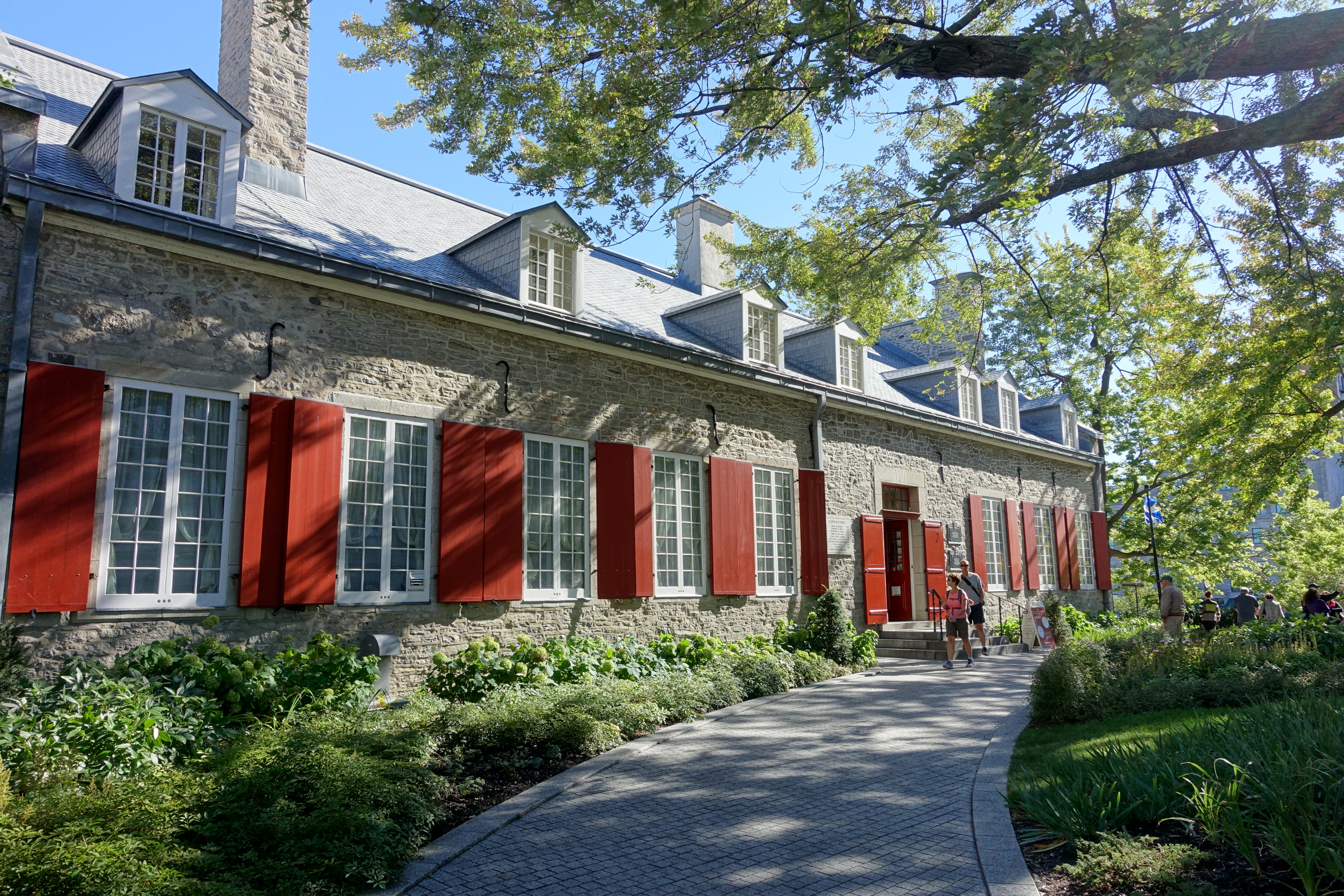
The Château Ramezay, is one of the best preserved mansion in Montreal, built in 1705.

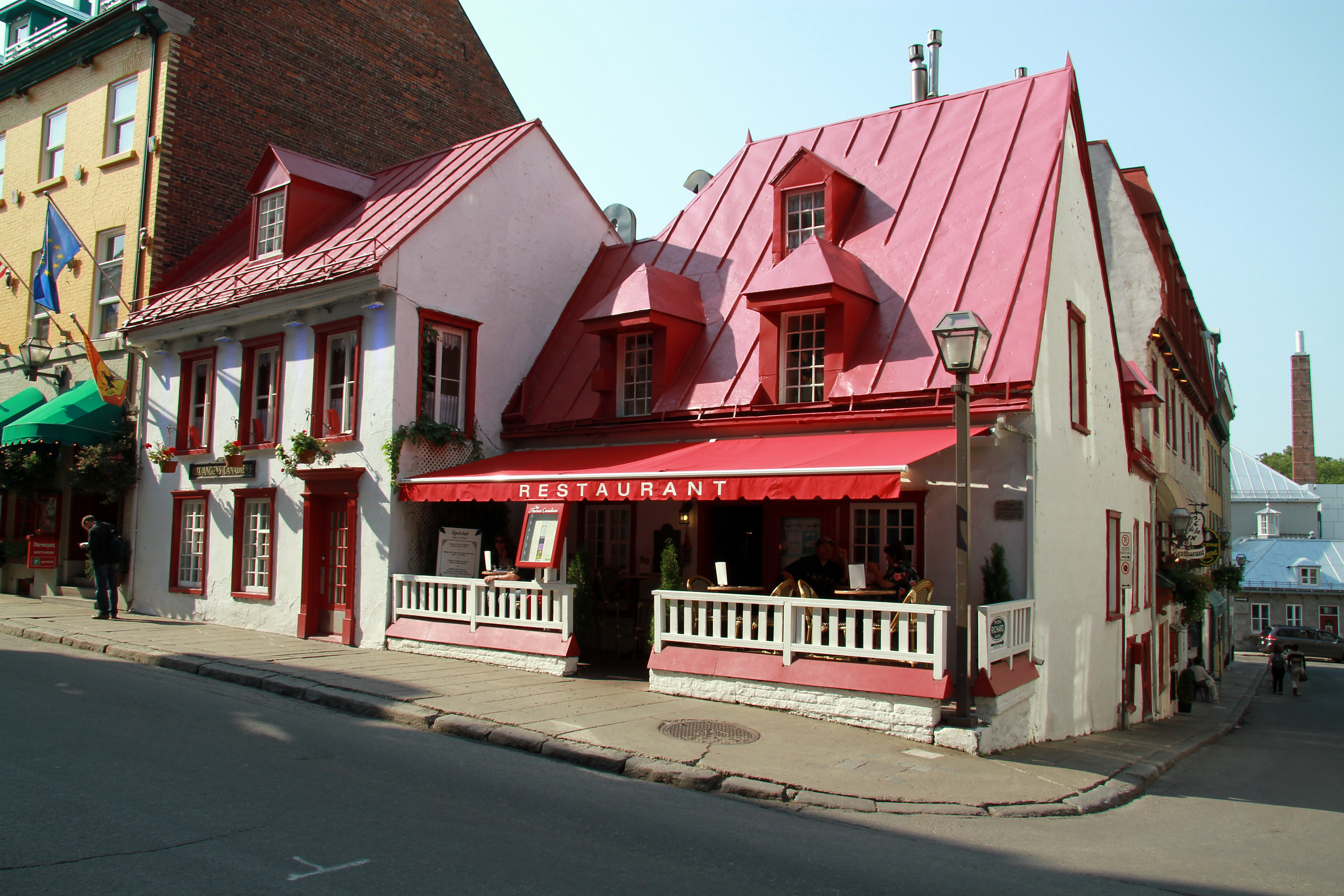
The Maison François-Jacquet-Dit-Langevin, located in the heart of Old Quebec, was built in 1675.

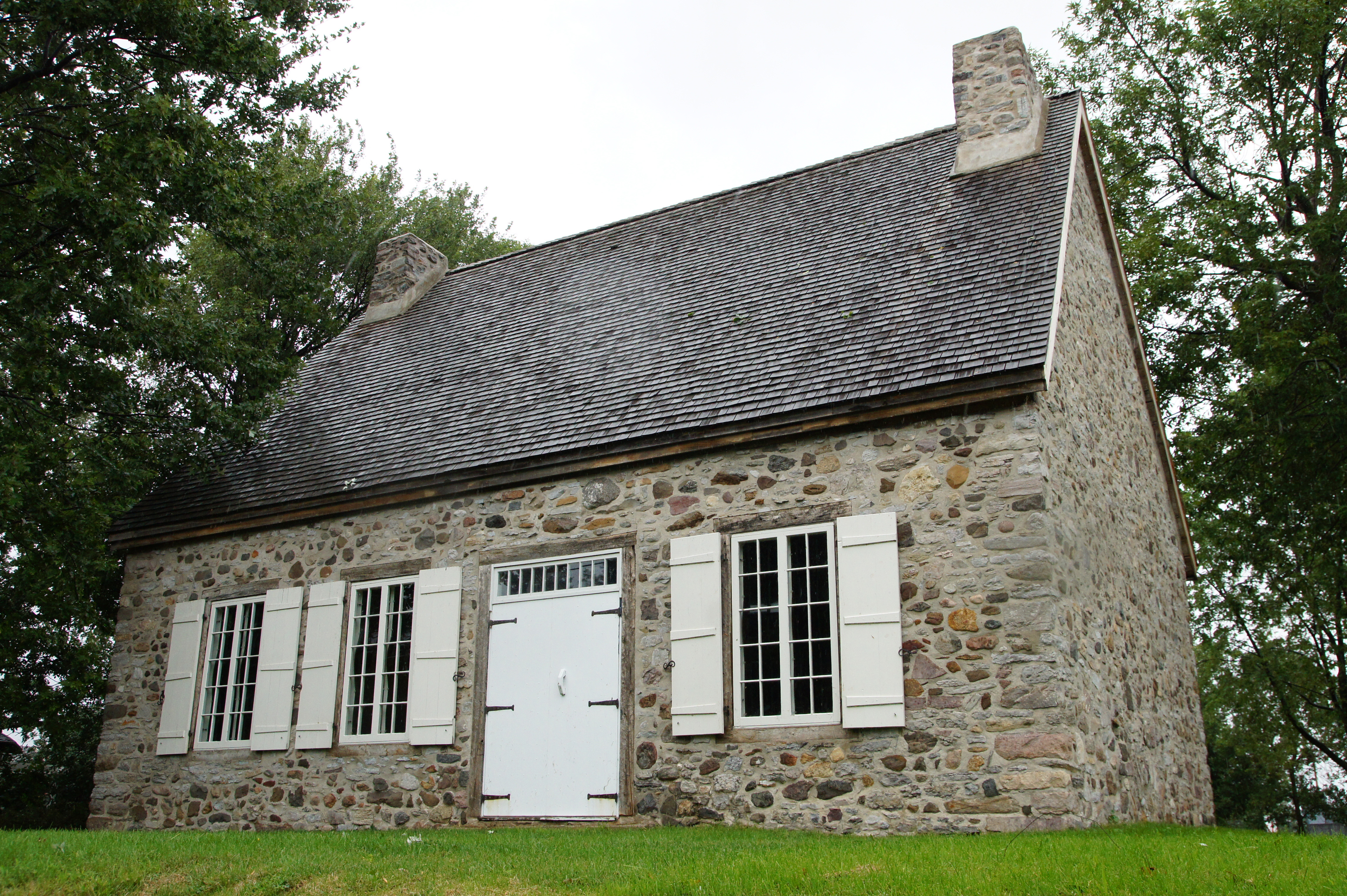
LeBer-LeMoyne House, was an important trading post when it was built in the late 17th century. It is today in historical museum of Montreal.

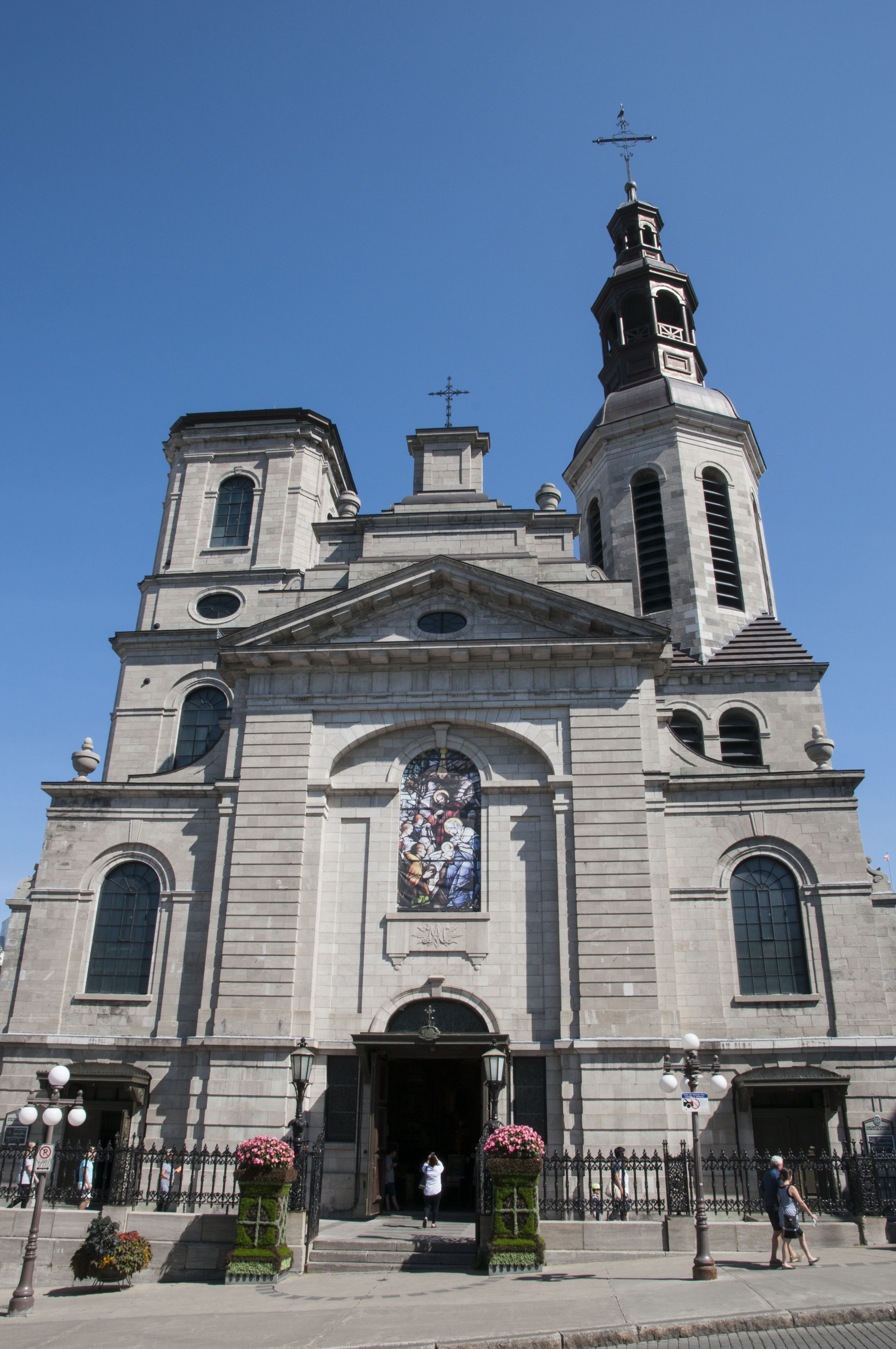
Cathedral-Basilica of Notre-Dame de Québec, started in 1647, is the oldest church in the Americas north of the Spanish colonies in Florida and New Mexico.

=== United States ===
French Colonial was one of four domestic architectural styles that developed during the colonial period in what would become the United States. The other styles were Colonial Georgian, Dutch Colonial, and Spanish Colonial. French Colonial developed in the settlements of the Illinois Country and French Louisiana. It is believed to have been primarily influenced by the building styles of French Canada and the Caribbean. It had its beginnings in 1699 with the establishment of French Louisiana but continued to be built after Spain assumed control of the colonial territory in 1763. Styles of building that evolved during the French colonial period include the Creole cottage, Creole townhouse, and French Creole plantation house.

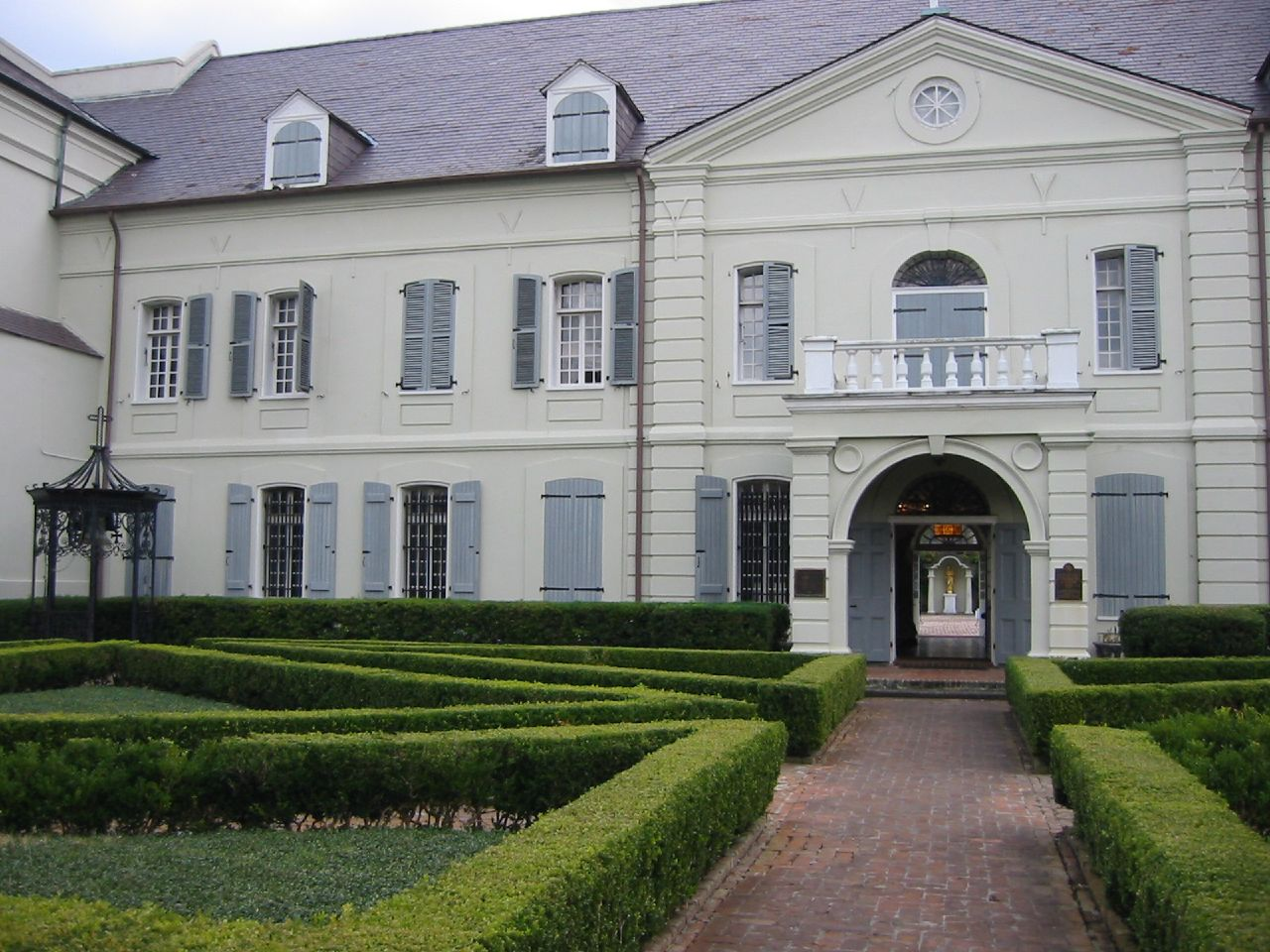
Ursuline Convent in New Orleans, built c. 1752. It is the oldest-surviving building from the French colonial period in New Orleans. It is an example of stuccoed brick construction.

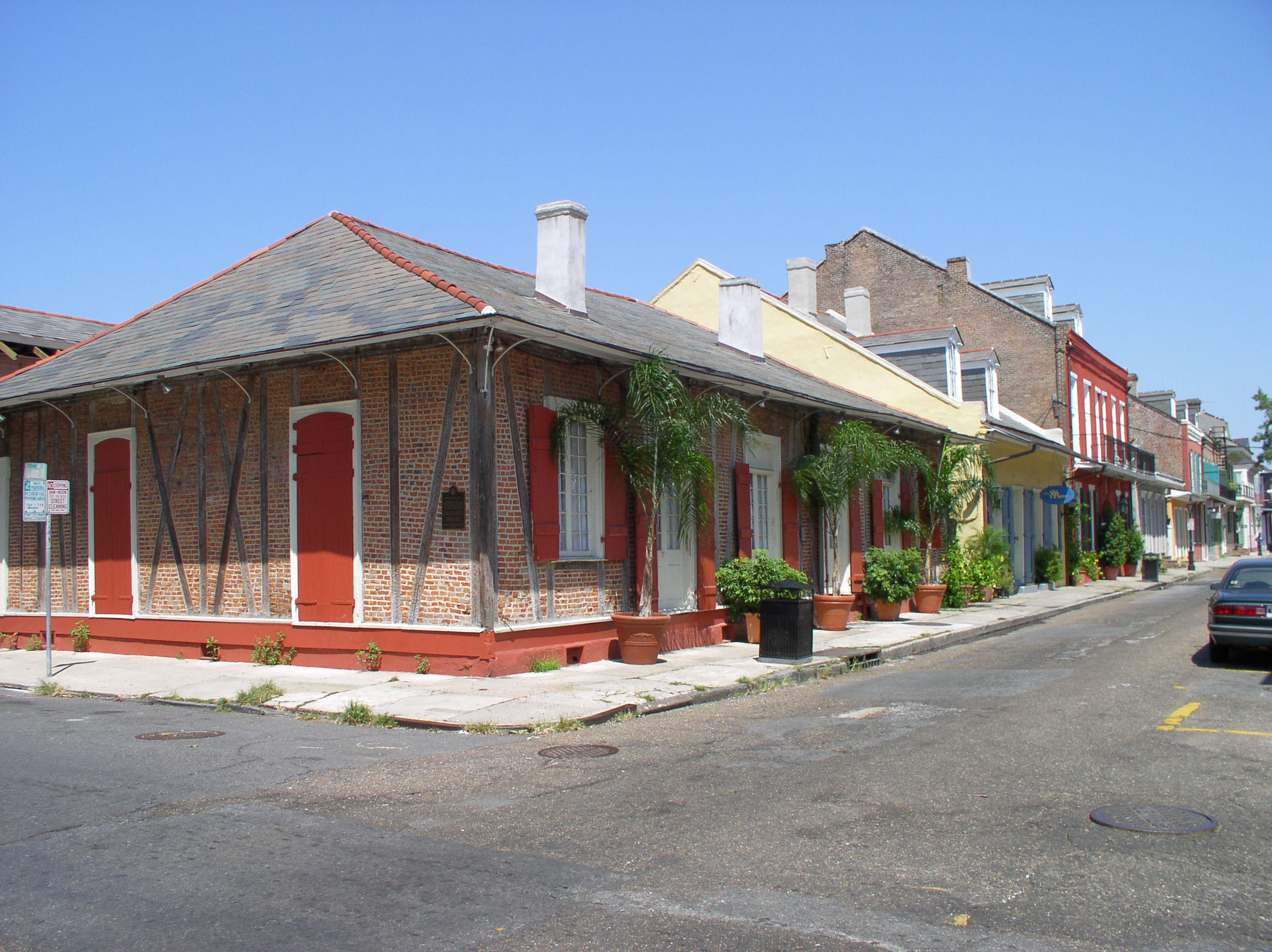
Gabriel Peyroux House in New Orleans, built c. 1780, is an example of briquette-entre-poteaux (brick-between-post) construction.

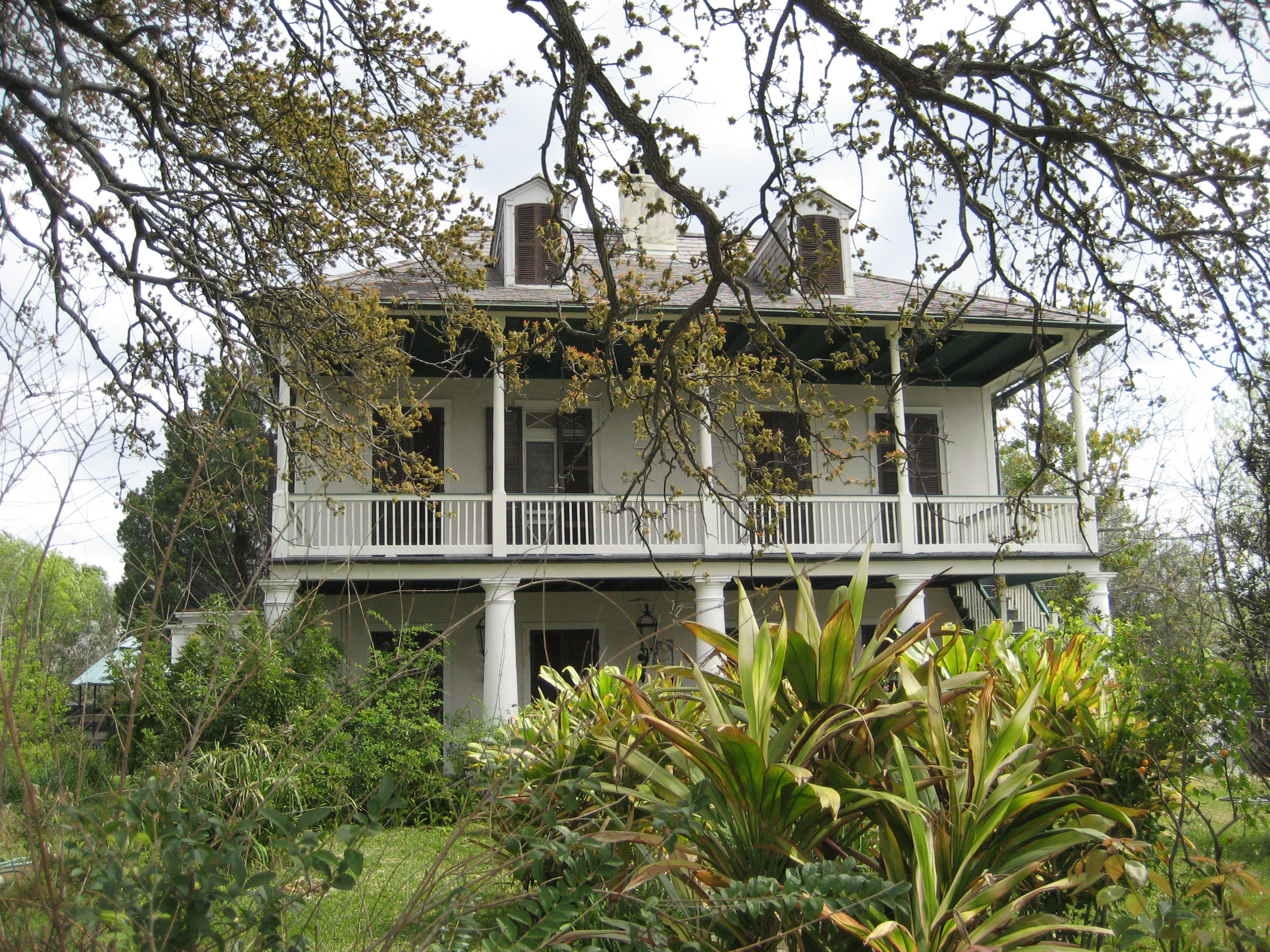
Lorreins Plantation, aka Old Spanish Customs House, in New Orleans, built c. 1784

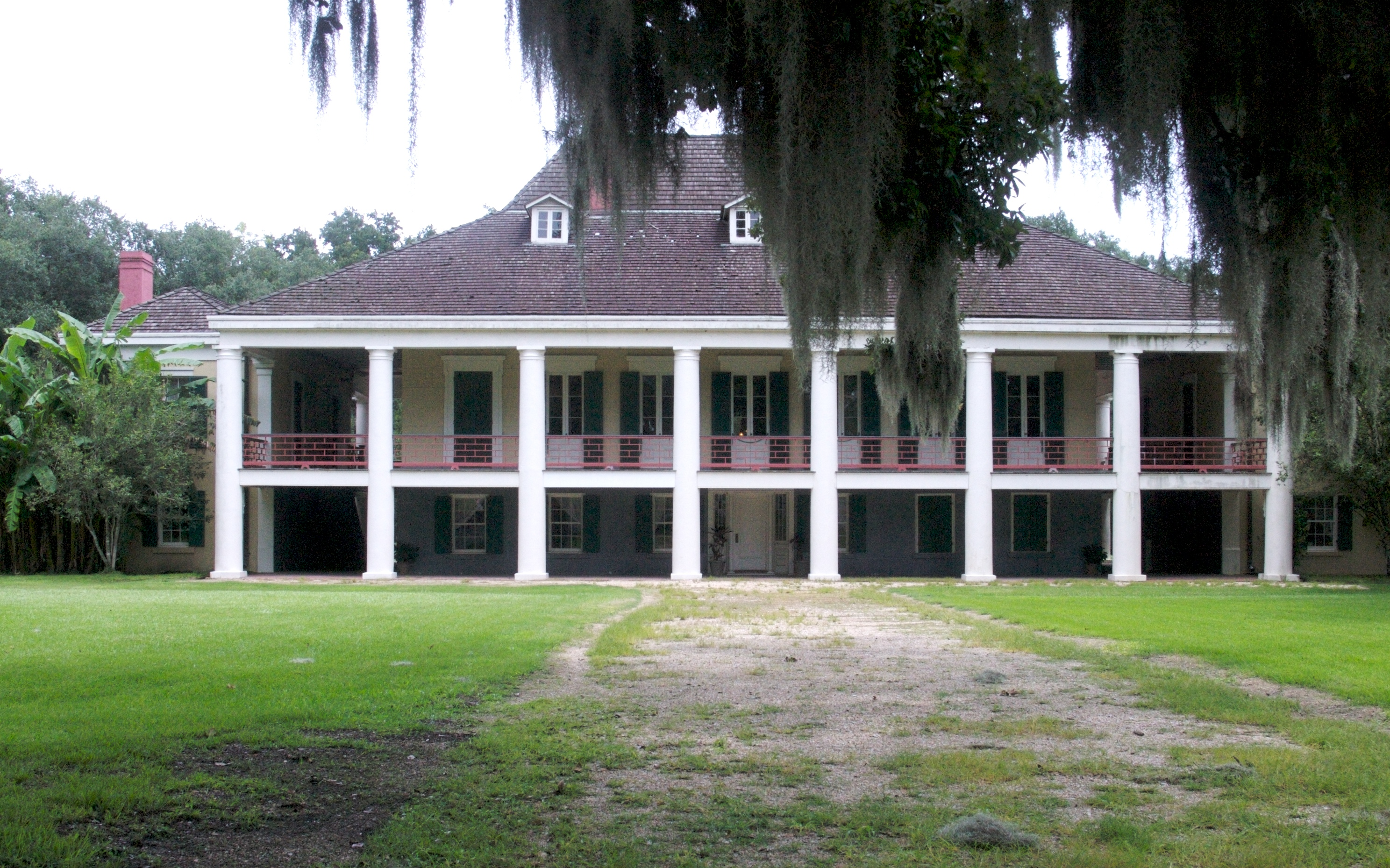
Destrehan Plantation near Destrehan, St. Charles Parish, Louisiana, built c. 1787, portions were altered in 1840 to reflect the Greek Revival style.

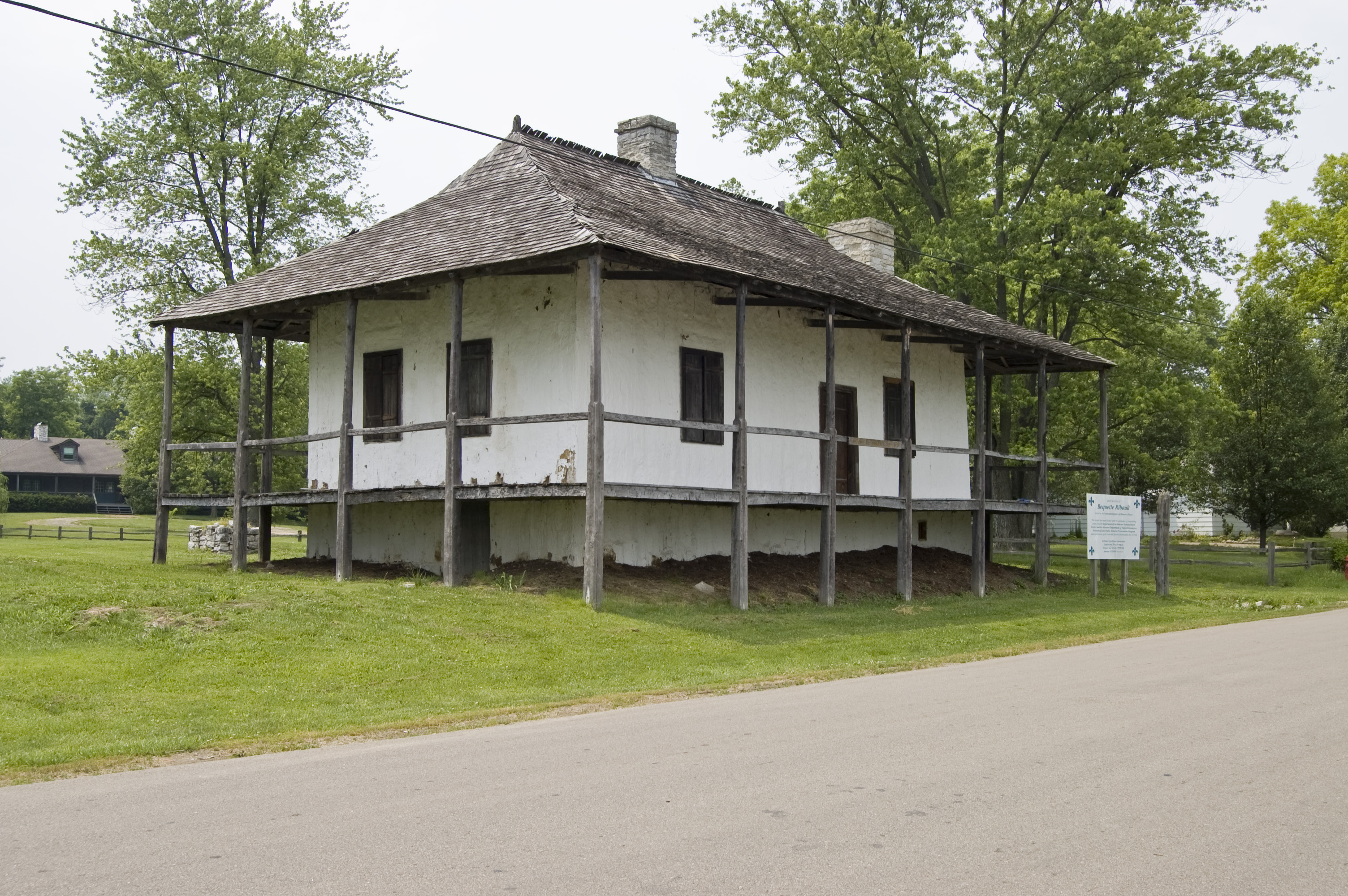
Bequette-Ribault House in Ste. Geneviève, Missouri, c. 1789 is an example of poteaux-en-terre construction.

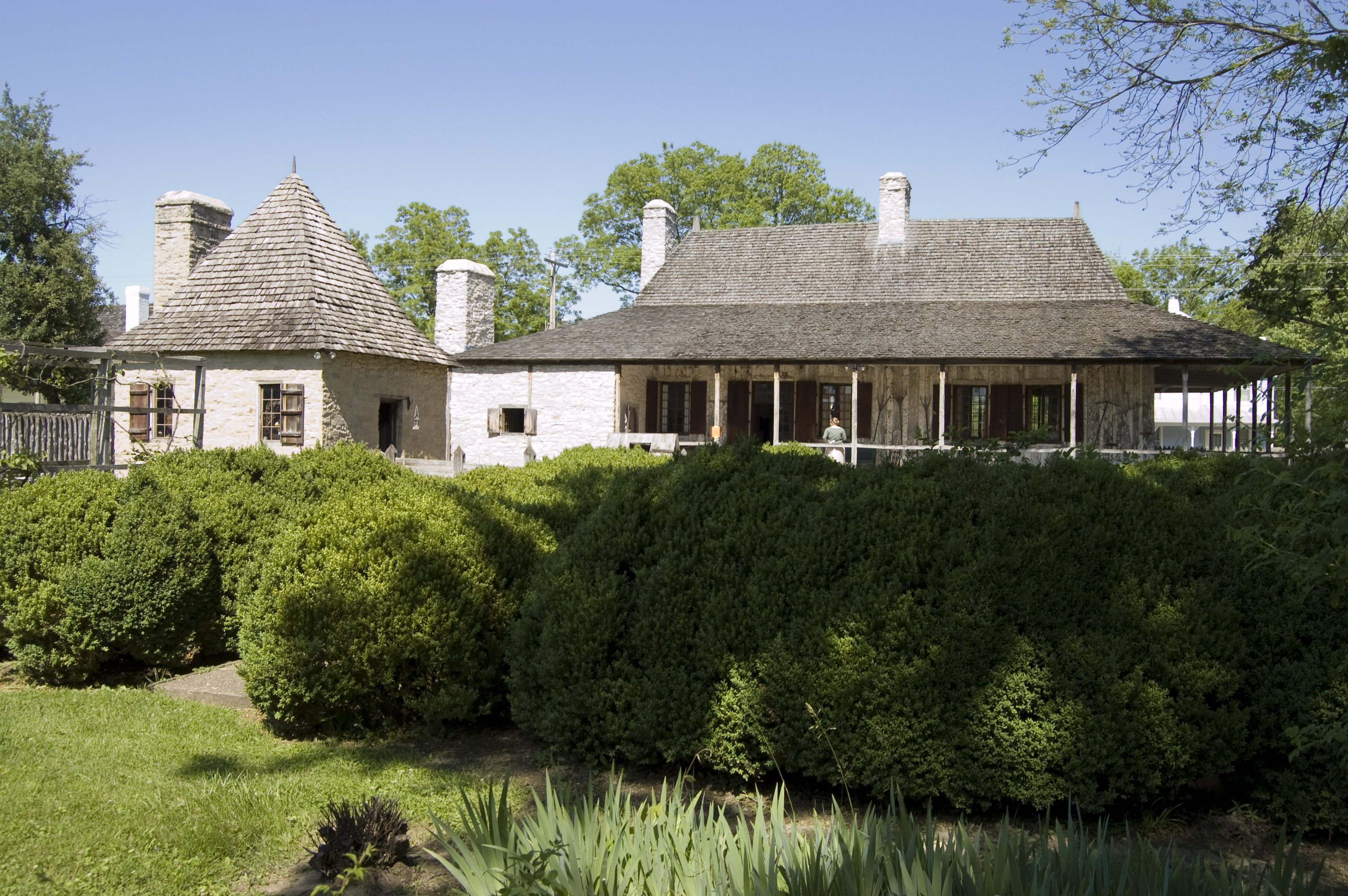
Louis Bolduc House Museum, in Ste. Geneviève, Missouri, c. 1792 is an example of poteaux-sur-sol construction.

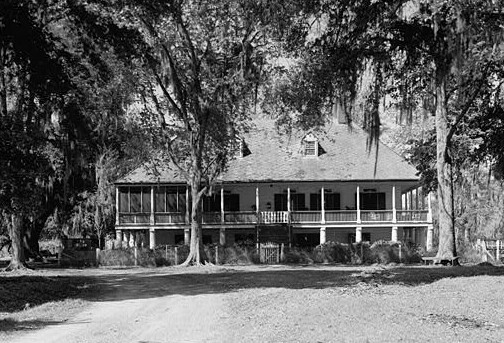
Parlange Plantation House in Mix, Louisiana, was built c. 1754 and is an early example of French Colonial architecture in the United States.

== See also ==
- American colonial architecture, which states that by 1770 the briquette-entre-poteaux replaced earlier types of French colonial construction.
- Creole cottage
  - Hotel St. Pierre
  - Lafitte's Blacksmith Shop
- List of French possessions and colonies
