= Lafitte's Blacksmith Shop =

- U.S. National Register of Historic Places
- U.S. National Historic Landmark
- U.S. National Historic Landmark District – Contributing property
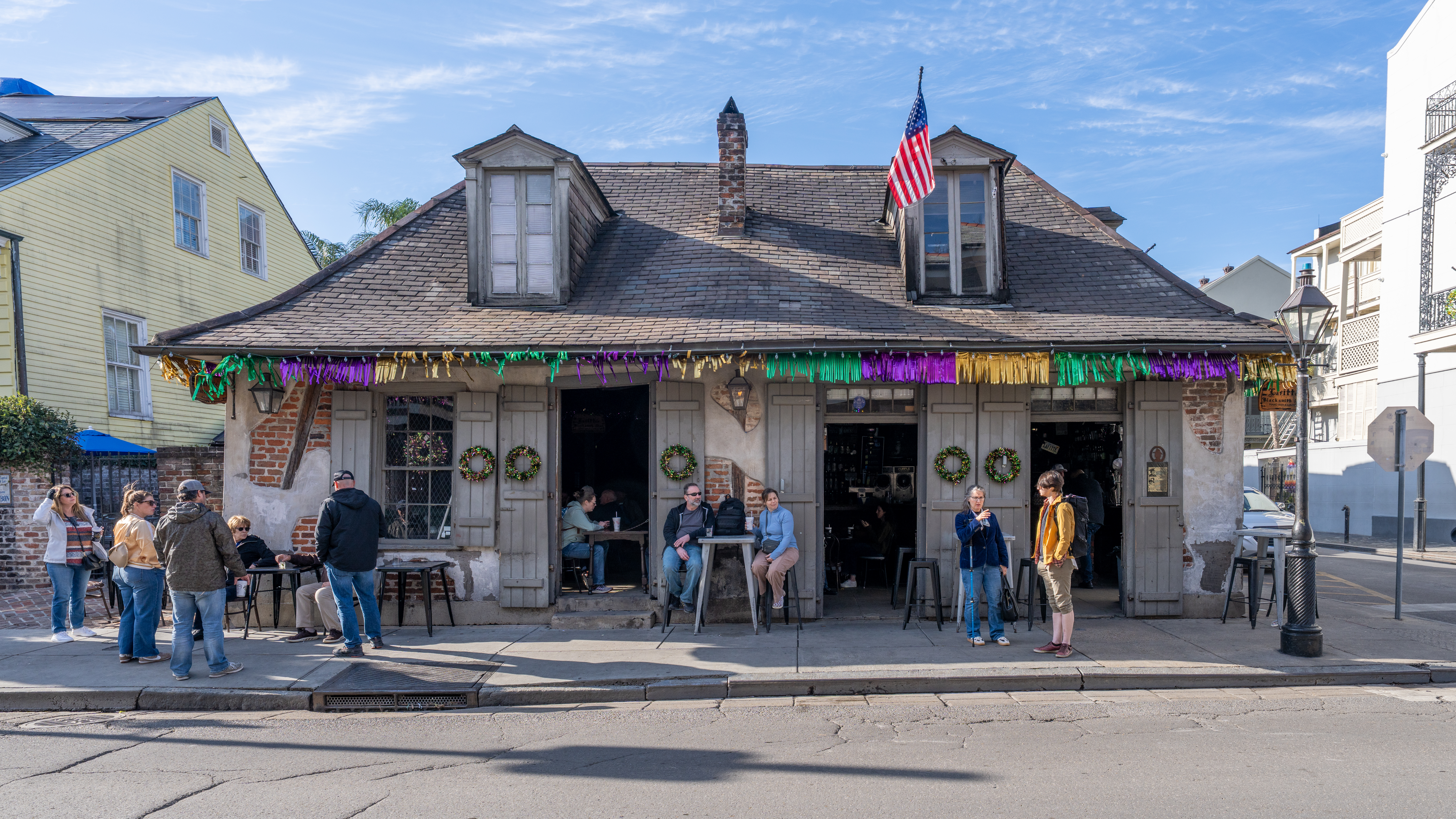

- Location within East New Orleans Location within Louisiana Location within the United States
- Location: 941 Bourbon St., New Orleans, Louisiana
- Coordinates: 29°57′38.66″N 90°3′50.02″W
- Built: 1770s
- Architectural style: French Colonial
- Part of: Vieux Carre Historic District (ID66000377)
- NRHP reference No.: 70000255

Significant dates
- Added to NRHP: April 15, 1970
- Designated NHL: April 15, 1970
- Designated NHLDCP: December 21, 1965

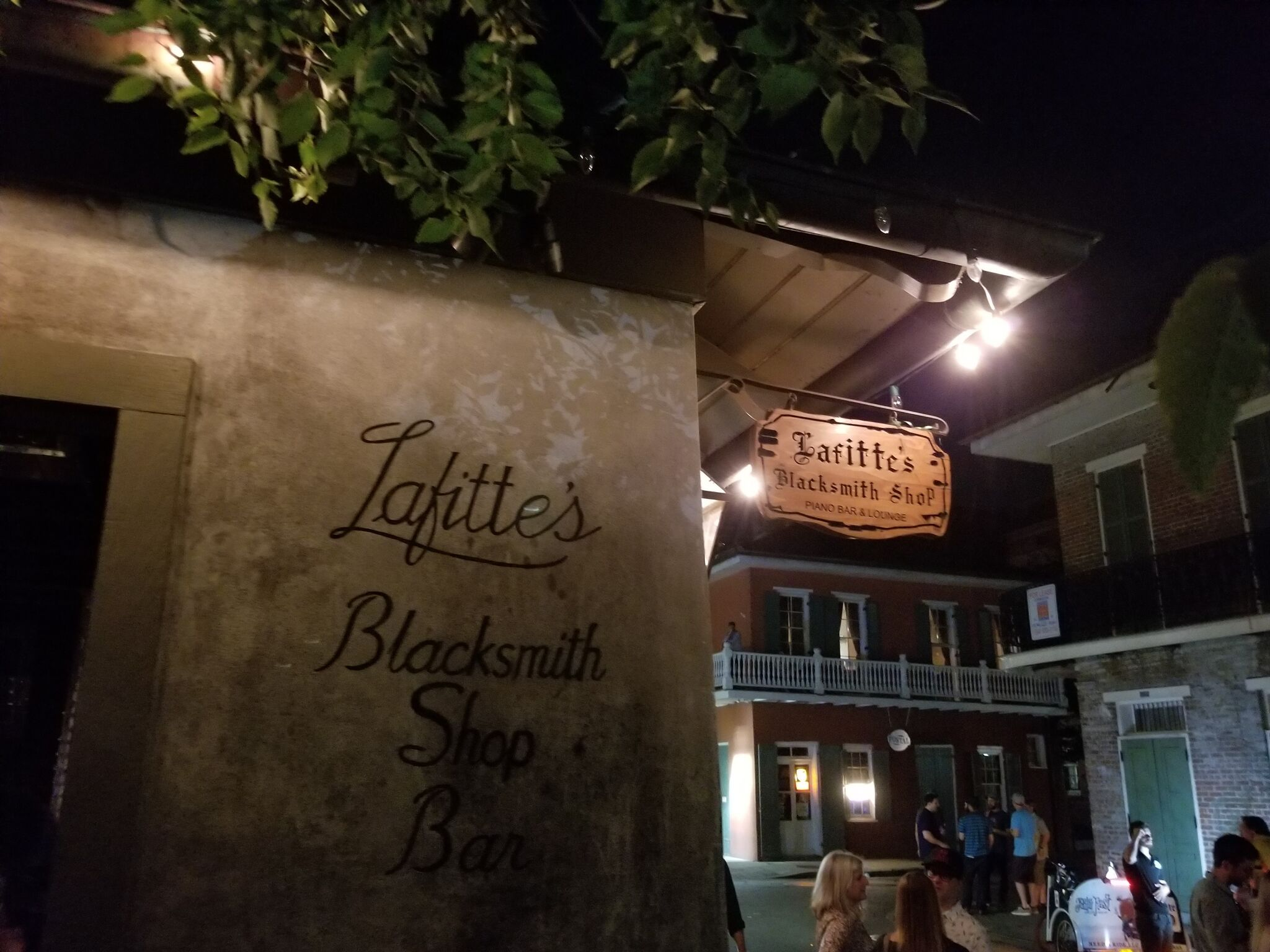

Lafitte's Blacksmith Shop is a historic structure at the corner of Bourbon Street and St. Philip Street in the French Quarter of New Orleans, Louisiana. Most likely built as a house in the 1770s during the Spanish colonial period, it is one of the oldest surviving structures in New Orleans.

According to legend, the privateer Jean Lafitte, aka John Lafitte, owned a business here in the early 19th century. As with many things involving the Lafittes, including the possibility that they used the structure to plot illegal seizures and the sale of contraband, no documentation exists (it was only after the Lafitte brothers were long gone that Jean's signature was found on a document, finally ascertaining how their family name was spelled: LAFFITE).

It is purported to be one of the more haunted venues in the French Quarter. The name Blacksmith Shop may not be coincidental. Lafitte's associates may have operated a smithy here during the days of reliance upon horses, who had to be shod. Jean's older brother Pierre Lafitte was a blacksmith, and their associate Renato Beluche may have once owned this building.

The current business traces its roots to Roger 'Tom' Caplinger, who in the mid-1940s turned the old abandoned shop into Café Lafitte. The cafe became a popular night spot that attracted a bohemian clientele, including the gay community and celebrities like Noël Coward and Tennessee Williams. However, Caplinger never held clear title to the property and the building was sold in 1953. He soon opened a second cafe at the other end of the same block named Café Lafitte in Exile, which maintains that it is the oldest gay bar in the U.S.

The building was declared a National Historic Landmark in 1970. It is a rare extant example of briquette-entre-poteaux construction.

== In fiction ==
Lafitte's Blacksmith Shop is featured in the historical novel Anthony Adverse by Hervey Allen. As depicted in the novel, the "blacksmith shop" was mainly a cover for maintaining a gang of exceptionally tall and strong black slaves – who were ostensibly engaged in shoeing horses while being used by the Lafitte brothers for intimidation, extortion and other criminal activities in and around New Orleans.

== See also ==
- Creole cottage, the architectural style
- Gabriel Peyroux House, a building similar to the former blacksmith shop
- List of National Historic Landmarks in Louisiana
- National Register of Historic Places listings in Orleans Parish, Louisiana
- List of the oldest buildings in Louisiana
