= Time Wars =

Time Wars may refer to:

- Time War (Doctor Who), a conflict mentioned in the television series Doctor Who
- TimeWars, a series of science fiction novels by Simon Hawke
