= LGBTQ history in Louisiana =

LGBTQ+ history in Louisiana has been shaped by a long history of legal and social intolerance, which began to give way to greater acceptance and visibility following the LGBTQ+ rights movement. Same-sex sexual acts were illegal in Louisiana from 1805 until 2003, when the U.S Supreme Court's ruling in Lawrence v. Texas struck down state sodomy laws nationwide. During this period, there was broad societal understanding that such acts, if they occurred were to remain "apolitical and private". Louisiana has traditionally been a heavily Catholic state, though Evangelical Christianity is more common today, and the state has historically been considered politically conservative, with few exceptions. These factors have been cited as contributing to a broader history of anti-LGBTQ+ sentiment in the state. Early LGBTQ+ villages nonetheless developed in Louisiana, though they were concentrated around more urban areas such as New Orleans.

== 1940–1970 ==
In 1949, the Fat Monday Luncheon, a private event for local gay men, was first held in New Orleans. The Krewe of Yuga was the first gay Carnival club in 1958, followed by the Krewe of Petronius in 1961. The Krewe of Yuga disbanded after a police raid on their fifth ball in 1962, but the Krewe of Petronius continued to hold balls. Other krewes formed despite the oppressive atmosphere, such as the Krewes of Amon-Ra, Ganymede, Armeinius, Apollo, Ishtar (the first lesbian krewe), and Olympus. After the closure of a bar at the Lafitte Blacksmith Shop on Bourbon Street, gay patrons moved to a bar around the corner, known as the Cafe Lafitte in Exile, and turned the bar into the oldest gay bar in New Orleans. In 1958, a gay tour guide from Mexico City, Fernando Rios, was killed after leaving the Cafe Lafitte with John Farrell, a student at Tulane University who had intended to rob a gay man that night. In 1967, District Attorney Jim Garrison arrested Clay Shaw, a local openly homosexual businessman, and charged Shaw with conspiring to assassinate John F. Kennedy. The trial eventually acquitted Shaw.

== 1970s ==
In 1970, the Gay Liberation Front of New Orleans was formed. In 1971, members of the Front presented a "Gay In" picnic in February in City Park. It would not become openly known as a "gay pride" event until 1978, when the pride events became the annual Gay Pride New Orleans. In 1972, the Tulane University Gay Students Union was established. Also in 1972, the first celebrations of Southern Decadence began with several parties encouraging guests to "Come As Your Favorite Southern Decadent." Next year began the costumed walking parade, which became the focus in 1974 with the selection of a grand marshal. Although it came from these modest beginnings, the Southern Decadence festival now covers an entire week of events, culminating with the annual parade in the French Quarter, generating millions of dollars for the city's economy. However, few remember that Decadence began with a group of straight and gay friends in the Faubourg Tremé neighborhood to celebrate the end of the long hot summers.

Members of the Front also organized a local chapter of the Daughters of Bilitis as well as the first local LGBTQ-affirming Christian congregation, an informal meeting of the Big Easy Metropolitan Community Church, which began to meet at the UpStairs Lounge in the French Quarter. However, on June 24, 1973, an arson attack on the club which provided room for the congregation to meet ended in 32 deaths from burning and smoke inhalation. The attack, which was never officially solved by New Orleans police, was a historical marker for LGBTQ+ people in Louisiana, as memorialization of the victims by local clergy proved just as difficult as finding proper burials for the dead. In 1975, the Gertrude Stein Society was established, becoming a local nexus for future gay rights activism in Louisiana. The IMPACT newspaper (first issue, 1977) and the Faubourg Marigny Bookstore were also established in this decade. In 1978, several Tulane Law students, along with other Tulane students, created a group known as “The Lambda Forum.” While primarily a social group, the organization did hold a sanctioned forum at the Law School, discussing Gay issues. The organization was active for approximately 3 years.

== 1980s ==
In 1980, the Louisiana Lesbian and Gay Political Action Caucus (LAGPAC) was created by a group of activists committed to attaining legal and social equality for Louisiana's gender and sexual minorities. Based in Alexandria, LAGPAC was a political organization that investigated the beliefs and stances of candidates running for public office and, through mailing lists, editorials (The Voter's Guide and The Lagniappe), and phone banking, encouraged its members to vote for candidates that were supportive of the LGBTQ+ community. Meanwhile, it aimed to sway the larger Louisiana population to support equality for the state's gender and sexual minorities. At its peak, LAGPAC also had chapters in Baton Rouge, New Orleans, and Acadiana, and influenced numerous elections. LAGPAC ceased operations in 2002, but Equality Louisiana is considered a successor of the organization. In 1989, Forum for Equality, Louisiana's largest LGBTQ+ rights lobby organization, was established. Other organizations formed by alumni of the Gertrude Stein Society include the Louisiana Gay Political Action Caucus (1980), the State Gay Conference (1981), the New Orleans Gay Men's Chorus and a local chapter of P-FLAG (both in 1982), and the NO/AIDS Task Force (1983).

== 1990s ==
In 1991, the New Orleans City Council passed an anti-discrimination ordinance into law covering the sexual orientation of city workers. In 1998, this was extended to include gender expression and identity. In 1994, the New Orleans City Council passed the Forum authored and sponsored domestic partnership law, providing for registration and benefits for same gender couples seeking to be recognized as domestic partners. In 1993, the Louisiana Electorate of Gays And Lesbians (LEGAL) was founded. LEGAL was a statewide non-profit organization dedicated to the equal rights of Louisiana's lesbians and gay men. The organization, which supported a full-time lobbyist at every session of the Louisiana Legislature through 1998, was instrumental in passing the state's hate crime law, inclusive of penalty enhancements for crimes motivated by the victim's sexual orientation or perceived sexual orientation - the first in the Deep South - and defeating an anti-gay marriage constitutional amendment. The group would also bring a decade's worth of challenges to the state's sodomy law. In 1997, Louisiana became the first state in the Deep South to pass a hate crimes law which covered sexual orientation. That same year, New Orleans mayor Marc Morial signed into law a domestic partnerships registry for same-sex couples resident in the city and for city workers. In June 1998, as part of Pride festivities, a memorial service for the UpStairs Lounge arson was organized with a jazz funeral and a memorial plaque laid at the site of the fire.

== 2000s ==
On September 18, 2004, by a significant margin, the voters of Louisiana approved a state constitutional amendment, Louisiana Constitutional Amendment 1, that banned same-sex marriages and civil unions. The measure did not ban domestic partnerships, however.

== 2010s ==
In 2011, Equality Louisiana was founded. With the support of local groups like Spectrum on LSU's campus, Capital City Alliance in Baton Rouge, People Acting for Change and Equality (PACE) in Shreveport, and Forum for Equality in New Orleans; Equality Louisiana formed to be a coalition of LGBTQ+ and allied organizations. With the concept that no single organization can move the state forward on their own, Equality Louisiana or EQLA served to coordinate statewide efforts. With a commitment to transgender inclusion, and the ability to make sure that voices from all over the state are heard, EQLA has been a leader in bringing the voices of LGBTQ+ people to the legislature.

== Present ==
Currently, around 52% of Louisianians support gay marriage rights, one of the lowest rates in the country. However, LGBTQ+ villages in the state such as New Orleans continue to be a hub for LGBTQ+ community, activism, art, and culture. Additionally, innumerable local organizations and nonprofits, such as Equality Louisiana, Baton Rouge Pride, Acadiana Queer Collective, New Orleans Black Pride, etc., continue to serve their communities.

== Notable LGBTQ+ Louisianians ==
- Diane Anderson-Minshall, writer for lesbian publications, attended Tulane and Xavier Universities in Louisiana
- Ti-Grace Atkinson (born in Baton Rouge), writer, former member of Daughters of Bilitis and NOW
- Kevyn Aucoin (born in Shreveport), make-up artist and photographer
- Bryan Batt (born in New Orleans), actor
- Poppy Z. Brite (born in New Orleans), writer
- Ellen DeGeneres (born in Metairie), stand-up comedian, television host and actress. She hosts the syndicated talk show The Ellen DeGeneres Show.
- Mary Gauthier (born in New Orleans), folk singer-songwriter.
- Tony Kushner, playwright and screenwriter, raised in Lake Charles as a child
- Don Lemon (born in Baton Rouge), CNN anchor
- Reed Erickson, transgender philanthropist, raised in Baton Rouge, graduated from Louisiana State University's school of mechanical engineering.
- Van Cliburn (born in Shreveport), pianist, winner of first quadrennial International Tchaikovsky Piano Competition in Moscow
