= Dominique You =

Privateer, soldier, and politician (1775–1830)

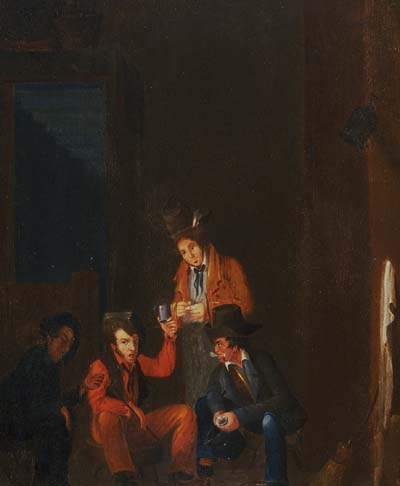
Drinkers, attributed to Ezra Ames (c. 1830s, oil on wood panel). Previously believed to depict You (standing) and the Lafitte brothers.

Dominique You or Youx (born Frederic You or Youx, c. 1775 – November 15, 1830) was a French privateer, soldier, and politician.

== Biography ==
According to information he provided to his masonic lodge in New Orleans, he was born in Cette (now spelled Sète) in Languedoc, France. (Contrary to the spurious Journal of Jean Laffite, he was not the older brother of Pierre and Jean Laffite.) He served as an artilleryman in the French Revolutionary Army. In 1802 he accompanied General Charles Leclerc's expedition to quell Toussaint Louverture's Haitian Revolution.

Following the failure of this expedition, Dominique You managed to reach Louisiana, where it is sometimes alleged thousands of pirates were based at that time. He appears to have joined Jean Lafitte and Pierre Lafitte. He became the captain of the pirate ship Le Pandoure. He was nicknamed "Captain Dominique" by the French and "Johnness" by the Americans. He acquired a reputation for being very bold and daring. During the next few years he and the Lafitte brothers became successful smugglers in the Louisiana bayous. As pirates, they preyed on Spanish ships in the Gulf of Mexico, doing extensive damage to Spanish commerce. On one occasion, a hurricane in the Gulf of Mexico caused severe damage to Le Pandoure and almost killed Captain You.

From 1804, the governor of newly American Louisiana (or "the Territory of Orleans"), William C. C. Claiborne, was making efforts to suppress piracy. In July 1814, Dominique You was publicly identified as a pirate. In September 1814, he was in charge of the privateer settlement at Barataria Bay when it was captured by American forces; he was taken prisoner along with other Baratarian pirates and imprisoned in the Cabildo in New Orleans.

Soon, however, in the context of the ongoing War of 1812, Jean Lafitte had the opportunity to offer to help General Andrew Jackson defend New Orleans against the impending British invasion, in exchange for a pardon for him and his pirate crews. Jackson accepted this offer, and You was appointed commander of a company of artillery which was composed of the Baratarians' best gunners. Compared to the official American forces, the pirates fought particularly well in the Battle of New Orleans on January 8, 1815, and were mentioned in Major General Andrew Jackson's general order of January 21 for having shown uncommon gallantry and skill in the field.

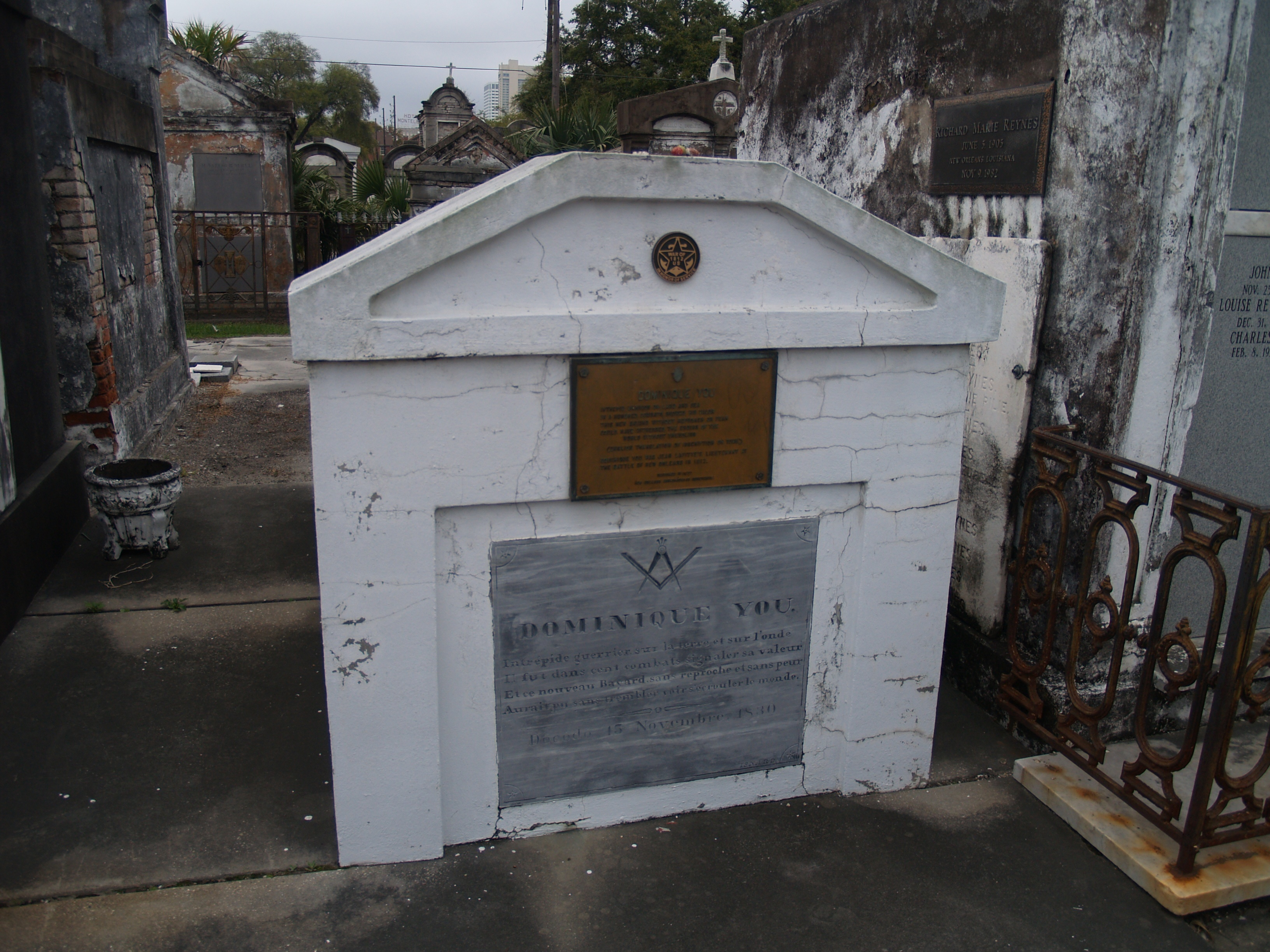
Tomb of Dominique You

As a result of this success, the charges against the Baratarians and Dominique You were dropped. After the battle, You settled in New Orleans where he became involved in politics as a partisan of Andrew Jackson. You died in New Orleans in 1830, receiving a military funeral at public expense. His grave bears a Freemasonic symbol.

== See also ==
- Battle of New Orleans
- Jean Lafitte
- Letter of marque
- Pierre Lafitte
- Privateering
- Renato Beluche
