= Jean Lafitte =

French pirate and privateer

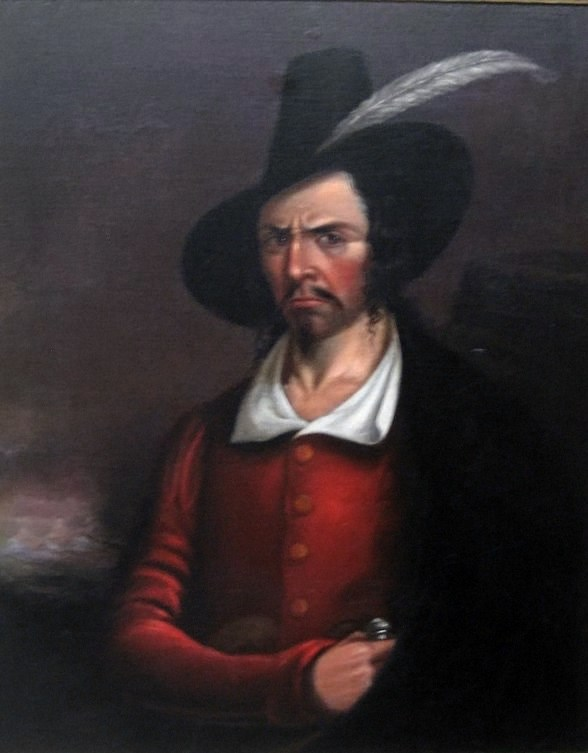
- Presumed portrait of Jean Lafitte
- Born: September 25, 1780; France or Saint-Domingue or New Orleans, Louisiana
- Died: c. February 5, 1823 (aged 42); Gulf of Honduras
- Piratical career
- Nickname: "The Terror of the Gulf"
- Type: Privateer, spy, naval artillery officer, slave trader
- Years active: 1810-1823
- Base of operations: Barataria Bay; Galveston Island
- Battles: War of 1812; Battle of New Orleans; West Indies anti-piracy operations of the United States

Jean Lafitte (c. 1780 – c. 1823) was a French pirate, privateer, and slave trader who operated in the Gulf of Mexico in the early 19th century. He and his older brother Pierre spelled their last name Laffite, but English language documents of the time used "Lafitte". This has become the common spelling in the United States, including places named after him.

Lafitte is believed to have been born either in Biarritz, in the French Basque Country, France, or the French colony of Saint-Domingue in the Caribbean. By 1805, he was operating a warehouse in New Orleans to help distribute the goods smuggled by his brother Pierre Lafitte. The United States government passed the Embargo Act of 1807 as tensions built with the United Kingdom by prohibiting trade. The Lafittes moved their operations to an island in Barataria Bay, Louisiana. By 1810, their new port had become very successful: the Lafittes had a profitable smuggling operation and also started to engage in piracy.

In 1812, the United States and the United Kingdom went to war. Despite Lafitte warning the other Baratarians of a possible military attack on their base, a US naval force successfully invaded in September 1814 and captured most of his fleet. Later, in return for a legal pardon, Lafitte and his fleet helped General Andrew Jackson during the Battle of New Orleans to defend the city. British forces sought access to the Mississippi River to gain control of the interior of the US. After securing victory, Jackson paid tribute in despatches to the Lafitte brothers' efforts, as well as those of their fellow privateers.

The Lafittes subsequently became spies for the Spanish during the Mexican War of Independence. In 1817, Jean founded a new colony on Galveston Island named Campeche. At its height, the colonists and privateers earned millions of dollars annually from stolen or smuggled coin and goods. Very little is known about Lafitte, and speculation about his life and death continues among historians.

== Origins ==
A number of details about Jean Lafitte's early life remain obscure, and often sources contradict each other. In the Journal de Jean Lafitte, the authenticity of which is contested, Lafitte claims to have been born in Bordeaux, France, in 1780 to Sephardic Jewish parents. His maternal grandmother and mother, both Conversos, fled Spain for France in 1765. His maternal grandfather had been executed by the Inquisition for "Judaizing". Some sources say that his father was French and his mother's family had come from Spain.

Lafitte and his brother Pierre also claimed to have been born in Bayonne. Other documents of the period place his birthplace as St. Malo or Brest in Brittany. Jack C. Ramsay, who published a 1996 biography of Lafitte, says, "this was a convenient time to be a native of France, a claim that provided protection from the enforcement of American law". He notes that still other contemporary accounts claim that Lafitte was born in Orduña, Spain, or in Westchester County, New York, north of Manhattan.

=== Saint-Domingue ===
Some sources speculate that Lafitte was born in the French colony of Saint-Domingue (known as Haiti since it gained independence in 1804). In the late 18th century, adult children of the French planters in Saint-Domingue often resettled along the Mississippi River in La Louisiane, especially in its largest city of New Orleans. Families with the surname Lafitte have been found in Louisiana documents from 1765. According to Ramsay, Lafitte's widowed mother migrated with her two sons, the elder Pierre and Jean, from Saint-Domingue to New Orleans in the 1780s. In approximately 1784, his mother married Pedro Aubry, a New Orleans merchant, keeping Jean with her. She placed Pierre to be raised by extended family elsewhere in Louisiana.

According to Ramsay, as a young man, Lafitte likely spent much time exploring the wetlands and bayou country south of New Orleans. In later years, he was described as having "a more accurate knowledge of every inlet from the Gulf than any other man". His elder brother Pierre became a privateer; he may have operated from Saint-Domingue, where the colonial government frequently issued letters of marque to profit from the shipping traffic of other nations.

Lafitte likely helped his brother to sell or trade the captured merchandise. By 1805 he is believed to have been running a warehouse in New Orleans and possibly a store on Royal Street.

=== France ===
Biographer William C. Davis suggests a different childhood for Lafitte. According to his 2005 book, Lafitte was born in or near Pauillac, France, the son of Pierre Lafitte and his second wife, Marguerite Desteil. The couple had six children, including at least three daughters. Jean Lafitte was likely born in 1782, although he was not baptized until 1786. Pierre Lafitte had an older son, his namesake Pierre, born from his first marriage to Marie LaGrange, who died in childbirth. The boys were given a basic Catholic education.

Acknowledging that details of Lafitte's first twenty years are sparse, Davis speculates that Lafitte spent much time at sea as a child, probably aboard ships owned by his father, a known trader. Davis places Lafitte's brother Pierre in Saint-Domingue by the late 1790s and the early 19th century. Due to escalating violence from the Haitian Revolution, in early 1803 Pierre boarded a refugee ship for New Orleans. This was the last year that Napoleon Bonaparte failed to regain control of Saint-Domingue. He withdrew his battered troops and ended French involvement in North America, selling the US what became known as the Louisiana Purchase in 1803: French-claimed lands west of the Mississippi River. By 1806, several "Captain Lafitte"s operated in New Orleans; Jean Lafitte was likely one of them.

=== Mexico ===
Sources from colonial Mexico refer to a man of French birth, known in Spanish as "Juan Lafita y Miramón", who was expelled from New Spain in 1796, during a period of anti-French agitation. Some historians have identified this man with Jean Lafitte.

"Juan Lafita" was born in France, apparently in early 1769. (Note: The passport issued to Juan Lafita on 9th February 1785 gave his age at that date as sixteen, implying a date of birth between February 1769 and February 1769, while in early 1795, he claimed to be twenty-five, implying a date of birth between January-March 1769 and January-March 1770.) By his own account, he was born in French Navarre, orphaned at the age of nine, brought to Spain by a friend of his family and educated in Madrid by a priest, although in giving this account, he may have been overplayingh his Spanish identity in an attempt to avoid deportation. What is certain is that he sailed from Spain to Mexico in early 1785, along with his mother's brother, Bernardo de Miramón, and a cousin, Marcus Laborda. (Note: In 1795, he claimed that they had left in 1784, but their passport was only issued at Cadiz in February 1785.) "Lafita" settled in the small town of Mextitlán, where he assisted his uncle Miramón in his activities as a judge, rancher and store-owner. However, the adoption of an anti-French policy by the government led to the family being targeted by local officials, and "Lafita" was imprisoned for two years, eventually leaving Mexico around the second half of 1796.

The historian Charles Ramsdell, who discovered these documents in 1937, was certain that the man they described was the future pirate, and connected the narrative that they provided to contemporary reports that Jean Laffite had a Spanish mother, but had been imprisoned by Spanish authorities, and as a result, had developed a deep hostility to Spain. If Juan Lafita y Miramón was indeed Jean Lafitte, it would make him a cousin of the Mexican soldier and statesman Miguel Miramón.

Lafitte's purported Journal, the authenticity of which is widely doubted, but which some researchers believe predates Ramsdell's discovery of these documents (see below), claims that this Juan Lafita was instead an uncle and namesake of Jean Lafitte.

== Character and abilities ==
Sources indicate that Lafitte was sharp and resourceful, but also handsome and friendly, enjoying drinking, gambling, and women. He was known to adopt more aristocratic mannerisms and dress than most of his fellow privateers.

Lafitte's native language was clearly French, though the specific dialect is a matter of some debate. He was evidently able to speak English reasonably well and most likely had a working knowledge of Spanish. He was educated with his brother at a military academy on Saint Kitts. No samples of his writing survive, except his signature; his surviving letters were always written by a secretary. His reading and writing abilities, therefore, remain unclear. During his life he acted as a soldier, sailor, diplomat, merchant, and much more, demonstrating natural gifts for leadership.

== Barataria ==
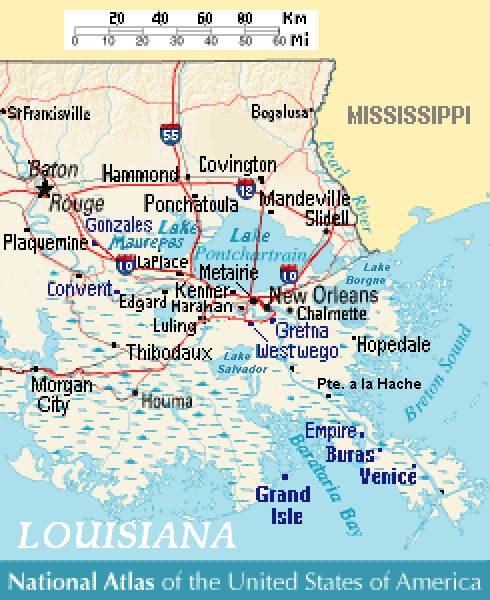
This 21st-century map shows Barataria Bay (lower right), near Grande Isle.

The United States made the Louisiana Purchase in 1803. In January 1808, the government began to enforce the Embargo Act of 1807, which barred American ships from docking at any foreign port and imposed an embargo on goods imported into the US. It was specifically intended to prohibit trade with the United Kingdom, as tensions were increasing between the two countries over the North American border with Canada and other issues. That was problematic for New Orleans merchants, who had depended on trade with the Caribbean colonies of Great Britain and other nations. The Lafitte brothers began to look for another port from which they could smuggle goods to local merchants.

They created a base on the small and sparsely populated island of Barataria, in Barataria Bay. The bay was located beyond a narrow passage between the barrier islands of Grand Terre and Grande Isle. Barataria was far from the US naval base, and ships could easily smuggle in goods without being noticed by customs officials. Workers would reload goods into smaller batches onto pirogues or barges, for transport through the many bayous to New Orleans.

Based in New Orleans, Pierre Lafitte looked after their interests in the city. Jean Lafitte spent most of his time in Barataria managing the daily hands-on business of outfitting privateers and arranging the smuggling of stolen goods. By 1810, the island had become a booming port. Seamen flocked to the island, working on the docks or at the warehouses until they were chosen as crew for one of the privateers.

Dissatisfied with their role as brokers, in October 1812 the Lafitte brothers purchased a schooner and hired Captain Trey Cook to sail it. As the schooner did not have an official commission from a national government, its captain was considered a pirate operating illegally. In January 1813, they took their first prize, a British hermaphrodite brig loaded with 77 slaves. Sale of the slaves and additional cargo generated $18,000 in profits.

The brothers adapted the captured ship for use in piracy and named it Dorada. Within weeks, Dorada captured a schooner loaded with goods valued at more than $9,000. The captured schooner was not considered useful for piracy and so after they had unloaded its cargo, the Lafittes returned the ship to its former captain and crew. The Lafittes gained a reputation for treating captive crew members well and often returned captured ships to their original crew.

The brothers soon acquired a third ship, La Diligente. They outfitted it with 12 fourteen-pounder cannons. Dorada captured a fourth ship, a schooner they renamed Petit Milan. The brothers stripped down their original ship and used its guns to outfit the new one.

They sailed three ships, which Davis described as likely "one of the largest privately owned corsair fleets operating on the coast, and the most versatile." For several months, the Lafittes would send the ships directly to New Orleans with legal cargo and would take on outgoing provisions in the city. The crew would create a manifest that listed not the provisions that had been purchased, but smuggled items stored at Barataria. Uninterested in exports from New Orleans, customs agents rarely checked the accuracy of the manifests. The ship would sail to the mouth of Bayou Lafourche, load the contraband goods, and sail "legally" back to New Orleans, with goods listed on a certified manifest.

=== Shifting attitudes ===
Governor William C.C. Claiborne took a leave of absence in September 1810, leaving Thomas B. Robertson as acting governor. Robertson was incensed by Lafitte's operation, calling his men "brigands who infest our coast and overrun our country". The residents of New Orleans were grateful to the Lafittes for providing them with luxuries otherwise prevented from being imported by the embargo. When Claiborne returned to office, he was relatively quiet on the subject.

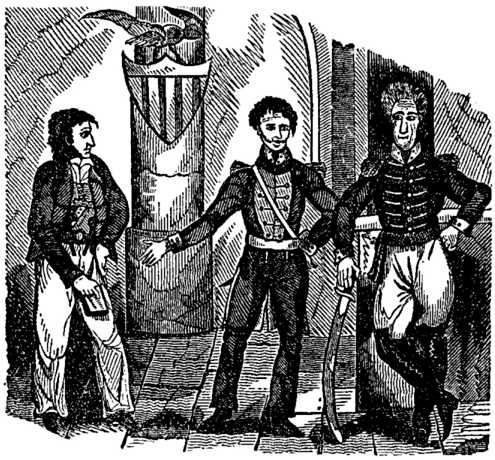
An 1837 woodcut of Lafitte, Governor W.C.C. Claiborne, and General Andrew Jackson during the War of 1812

On June 18, 1812, the United States declared war on Great Britain. Britain maintained a powerful navy, but the United States had little naval power. The US built 13 warships in upstate New York to operate on the Great Lakes, but in other areas supplemented its navy by offering letters of marque to privately owned armed vessels.

New Orleans issued six such letters, primarily to smugglers who worked with Lafitte at Barataria. The smugglers often held letters of marque from multiple countries, authorizing them to capture booty from differing nations. They submitted booty from captured British ships to the American authorities at New Orleans, and booty from all other ships was often channeled for sale on the markets through Lafitte's operation.

As the smuggling operations reduced the amount of revenue collected by customs offices, American authorities were determined to halt business at Barataria. Because the US Navy did not have enough ships to act against the Baratarian smugglers, the government turned to the courts. On November 10, 1812, United States District Attorney John R. Grymes charged Lafitte with "violation of the revenue law." Three days later, 40 soldiers were sent to ambush the Baratarians and captured Lafitte, his brother Pierre, and 25 unarmed smugglers on November 16. They confiscated several thousand dollars of contraband. Officials released the smugglers after they posted bail; the men quickly disappeared and refused to return for a trial.

Although under indictment, in March 1813 Lafitte registered as captain of Le Brig Goelette la Diligente for a supposed journey to New York. Biographer Jack Ramsay speculates that the voyage was intended to "establish ... [Lafitte] as a privateering captain". Lafitte soon acquired a letter of marque from Cartagena, but never sent any booty there. He brought all captured goods to Barataria.

Lafitte's continued flouting of the laws angered Governor Claiborne, who, on March 15, issued a proclamation against the Baratarian "banditti ... who act in contravention of the laws of the United States ... to the evident prejudice of the revenue of the federal government". The proclamation was printed in the nationally read Niles' Weekly Register.

In October, a revenue officer prepared an ambush of a band of Lafitte's smugglers. The smugglers wounded one of the officers and safely escaped with the contraband. The following month, the governor offered a $500 reward for Lafitte's capture. Within two days of his offer, handbills were posted all over New Orleans offering a similar award for the arrest of the governor. Although the handbills were made in Lafitte's name, Ramsay believes "it is unlikely [the handbills] originated with him". Following the reward offer, Lafitte wrote Claiborne a note denying the charges of piracy.

Given the success of his auctions at the Temple, in January 1814 Lafitte set up a similar auction at a site just outside New Orleans. Many of the city's merchants were unhappy with this auction, because it allowed their customers to buy goods directly from Lafitte at a lower price than the merchants could charge in the city. Officials tried to break up this auction by force. In the ensuing gunfight, one of the revenue officers was killed and two others were wounded.

Claiborne appealed to the new state legislature, citing the lost revenues due to the smuggling. He requested approval to raise a militia company to "disperse those desperate men on Lake Barataria whose piracies have rendered our shores a terror to neutral flags". The legislature appointed a committee to study the matter but, as most of their constituents benefitted by the smuggling, they never authorized the militia.

A grand jury indicted Pierre Lafitte after hearing testimony against him by one of the city's leading merchants. He was arrested, tried, convicted, and jailed on charges of "having knowingly and wittingly aided and assisted, procured, commanded, counselled, and advised" persons to commit acts of piracy".

== War of 1812 ==
=== British offer ===
Following the charges of November 10, 1812, and subsequent arrest and jailing of his brother Pierre, Jean Lafitte operated the piracy and smuggling business. Over the next few months, the British Navy increased patrols in the Gulf of Mexico, and by August they had established a base at Pensacola. On September 3, 1814, the British ship HMS Sophie fired on a pirate ship returning to Barataria. Lafitte's ship grounded in shallow water where the larger British ship could not follow. The British raised a white flag and launched a small dinghy with several officers. Lafitte and several of his men rowed to meet them halfway.

Captain Nicholas Lockyer, the commander of the Sophie, had been ordered to contact the "Commandant at Barataria". He was accompanied by a Royal Marine infantry captain, John McWilliam, who had been given a package to deliver to Lafitte. The Baratarians invited the British officers to row to their island. When they had disembarked and were surrounded by his men, Lafitte identified himself to them. Many of the smugglers wanted to lynch the British men, but Lafitte intervened and placed guards outside his home to ensure their protection.

McWilliam brought two letters in his packet for Lafitte: one, under the seal of King George III, offered Lafitte and his forces British citizenship and land grants in the British colonies in the Americas (by then, these consisted of islands in the Caribbean and territory in Upper and Lower Canada). In exchange, the king asked for Lafitte and his forces to promise to assist in the naval fight against the United States and to return any recent property that had been captured from Spanish ships. (Spain had become an ally of the British against the French.) If they refused the offer, the letters informed Lafitte that the British had orders to capture Barataria to put an end to their smuggling. The second item was a personal note to Lafitte from McWilliam's superior, Lieutenant Colonel Edward Nicolls, urging him to accept the offer.

Believing that the Americans would eventually prevail in the war against Britain, Lafitte thought he could more easily defeat the US revenue officers than he could the British Navy. He had also been told in August that American officials were planning an assault on Barataria with forces under the command of Commodore Daniel Patterson. They feared that Lafitte and his men might side with the British.

Lafitte tried to convince the Americans that they had nothing to fear from him. He sent a message to the Americans that few of his men favored helping the British but said he needed 15 days to review their offer. Lafitte had copies of the letters sent to Jean Blanque, a member of the Louisiana state legislature who had invested in the Barataria operation. In a personal note, Lafitte reminded Blanque that his brother Pierre was still in jail and deserved an early release.

Lafitte added a note to Governor Claiborne, saying,

I am the stray sheep, wishing to return to the sheepfold... If you were thoroughly acquainted with the nature of my offenses, I should appear to you much less guilty, and still worthy to discharge the duties of a good citizen.

Lafitte committed himself and his men for any defensive measures needed by New Orleans. Within two days of Lafitte's notes, Pierre "escaped" from jail.

=== American invasion ===
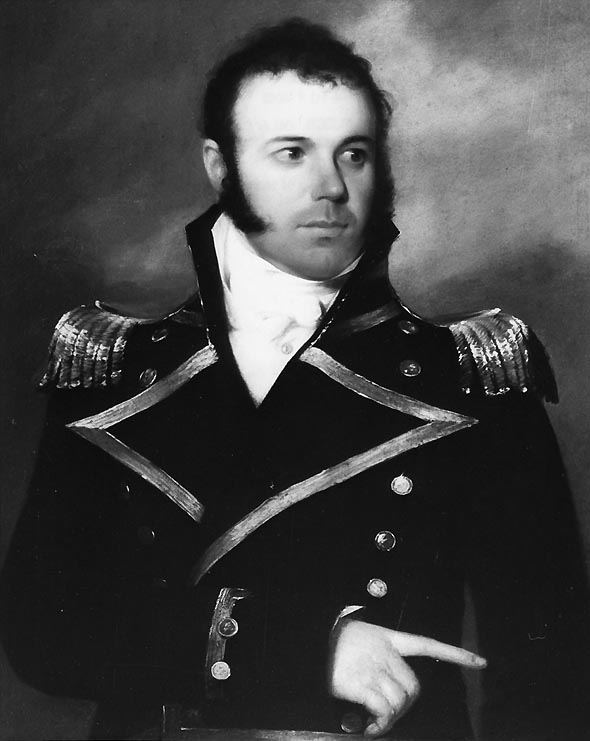
US Commodore Daniel Patterson commanded an offensive force against Lafitte and his men at Barataria, 1814.

The US ordered an attack on Lafitte's colony. On September 13, 1814, Commodore Daniel Patterson set sail aboard the USS Carolina for Barataria. He was accompanied by six gunboats and a tender. The fleet anchored off Grande Terre and the gunboats attacked. By midmorning, 10 armed pirate ships formed a battle line in the bay. Within a short period, Lafitte's men abandoned their ships, set several on fire, and fled the area. When Patterson's men went ashore, they met no resistance. They took 80 people captive, but Lafitte escaped safely. The Americans took custody of six schooners, one felucca, and a brig, as well as 20 cannon and goods worth $500,000.

On September 23, Patterson and his fleet, including the eight captured ships, began the return trip to New Orleans. Widely publicized, the raid was hailed by the Niles' Weekly Register as "a major conquest for the United States".

Lafitte was described as

a man who, for about two years past, has been famous for crimes that the civilized world wars against. ... [He] is supposed to have captured one hundred vessels of all nations, and certainly murdered the crews of all that he took, for no one has ever escaped him.

Following the custom of the times, Patterson filed a legal claim for the profits from the confiscated ships and merchandise. An attorney representing Lafitte argued that the captured ships had flown the flag of Cartagena, an area at peace with the United States. One of Lafitte's men testified that the Baratarians had never intended to fight the US but had prepared their vessels to flee. The judge ruled that Patterson should get the customary share of profits from the goods that had already been sold, but he did not settle the ownership of the ships. They were held in port under custody of the United States Marshal.

Likely inspired by Lafitte's offer to help defend Louisiana, Governor Claiborne wrote the US Attorney General, Richard Rush requesting a pardon for the Baratarians, saying that for generations, smugglers were "esteemed honest ... [and] sympathy for these offenders is certainly more or less felt by many of the Louisianans". According to Ramsay, Claiborne next wrote to General Andrew Jackson, "implying Patterson had destroyed a potential first line of defense for Louisiana" by his capture of Lafitte and his ships. Jackson responded, "I ask you, Louisianans, can we place any confidence in the honor of men who have courted an alliance with pirates and robbers?"

=== Battle of New Orleans ===
When General Andrew Jackson arrived in New Orleans on December 1, 1814, he discovered the city had not created any defenses. It had approximately 1,000 unseasoned troops and two ships for its use. Although the city kept control of the eight ships taken from Lafitte, it did not have enough sailors to man them for defense. Resentful of the raid on Barataria, Lafitte's men refused to serve on their former ships.

In mid-December, Jackson met with Lafitte, who offered to serve if the United States would pardon those of his men who agreed to defend the city. Jackson agreed to do so. On December 19, the state legislature passed a resolution recommending a full pardon for all of the former residents at Barataria. With Lafitte's encouragement, many of his men joined the New Orleans militia or as sailors to man the ships. Others formed three artillery companies.

On December 23, advance units of the British fleet reached the Mississippi River. Lafitte realized that the American line of defense was so short as to potentially allow the British to encircle the American troops. He suggested that the line be extended to a nearby swamp, and Jackson ordered it done. The British began advancing upon the American lines on December 28, but were repulsed by an artillery crew manned by two of Lafitte's former lieutenants, Renato Beluche and Dominique Youx.

Patterson praised the Barataria men who served on one of the US Navy ships, and whose skill with artillery was greater than their British counterparts. On land and sea, the former pirate gunners earned praise as the battle continued. On January 21, Jackson issued a statement praising his troops, especially the cannoneers and "Captains Dominique and Beluche, lately commanding privateers of Barataria, with part of their former crews and many brave citizens of New Orleans, were stationed at Nos. 3 and 4." Jackson praised Jean and Pierre Lafitte for having "exhibited the same courage and fidelity". He formally requested clemency for the Lafittes and the men who had served under them. The government granted them all a full pardon on February 6.

== Galveston ==
The flag of the United Provinces of New Granada, which was later adopted and used by Jean Lafitte from 1817 to 1821 at Galveston Island, Spanish Texas, New Spain

In late 1815 and early 1816, the Lafitte brothers agreed to act as spies for Spain, which was embroiled in the Mexican War of Independence. Collectively they were known as "Number thirteen". Pierre was to inform about the situation in New Orleans. Jean was sent to Galveston Island, a part of Spanish Texas that served as the home base of Louis-Michel Aury, a French privateer who claimed to be a Mexican revolutionary. By early 1817, other revolutionaries had begun to congregate at Galveston, hoping to make it their base to wrest Mexico from Spanish control. Lafitte visited in March 1817. Two weeks into his stay, the two leaders of the revolutionaries left the island.

The following day, Lafitte took command of the island and appointed his own officers. On April 18, he sailed for New Orleans to report his activities. With Spanish permission, Lafitte returned to Galveston, promising to make weekly reports of his activities.

Lafitte essentially developed Galveston Island as another smuggling base. Like Barataria, Galveston was a seaward island that protected a large inland bay. As part of Mexico, it was outside the authority of the United States. It was largely uninhabited, except by the Karankawa, a Native American people. Texas was lightly populated at this time, and the base had no significant populations nearby. It was, at least initially, relatively free of scrutiny from any of the governments in the region.

Lafitte named his colony Campeche, after a Mexican outpost further south along the Gulf Coast. His men tore down the existing houses and built 200 new, sturdier structures. Ships operating from Galveston flew the flag of Mexico, but they did not participate in the revolution. Lafitte wanted to avoid a Spanish invasion. Aury returned to Galveston several months later, but he left in July when he realized that the men were unwilling to revolt.

In less than a year, Lafitte's colony grew to 100–200 men and several women. Lafitte interviewed all newcomers and required them to take an oath of loyalty to him. The headquarters consisted of a two-storey building facing the inland harbor, where landings were made. The building was surrounded by a moat and painted red; it became known as Maison Rouge. Lafitte conducted most of his business aboard his ship, The Pride, where he also lived. Lafitte forged letters of marque from an imaginary nation to fraudulently authorize all the ships sailing from Galveston as privateers. The letters gave the ships permission to attack ships from all nations.

At its peak the colony had more than two thousand inhabitants and 120 separate structures. Annual income reached more than $2 million ($42.1 million in today's terms) in stolen currency and goods. Lafitte for a time lived lavishly, complete with servants and the finest housewares and other accoutrements.

In April 1818, the United States passed a law prohibiting the import of slaves into any port in the United States. The law left several loopholes, giving permission to any ship to capture a slave ship, regardless of the country of origin. Slaves captured in such actions who were turned over to the customs office would be sold within the United States, with half the profits going to the people who turned them in. Lafitte worked with several smugglers, including Jim Bowie, to profit from the poorly written law. Lafitte's men identified slave ships and captured them. Smugglers would purchase the slaves for a discounted price, march them to Louisiana, and turn them in to customs officials. A representative of the smuggler would purchase the slaves at the ensuing auction, and the smuggler would be given half of the purchase price. The smuggler became the lawful owner of the slaves and could resell them in New Orleans, or transport them for sale in other parts of the Deep South, which was the major slave market of the time. It was being developed for cotton culture, as invention of the cotton gin had made short-staple cotton profitable.

In 1818, the Campeche colony suffered hardships. After Lafitte's men abducted a Karankawa woman, warriors of her tribe attacked and killed five men of the colony. The corsairs fired artillery at the Karankawa, killing many of the men in the tribe. A hurricane in September resulted in flooding of most of the island, and several people died. It destroyed four ships and most buildings. Only six houses survived as habitable.

=== Ventures in the Arkansas Region ===
Lafitte was commissioned by the Spanish government in 1816 to gain information regarding the attitudes of residents of the Mississippi River valley toward American expansion into Texas. According to historian William C. Davis, the Spanish feared the settlers arriving in the Arkansas region could be the first in a long line of Americans ultimately seeking to settle in Texas. This expedition during which Lafitte and Latour traversed the Mississippi Territory and what would become the state of Arkansas. Under the pseudonym "Captain Hillare," Lafitte departed from New Orleans and sailed up the Mississippi River to the mouth of the Arkansas River. Lafitte and his cohort, Latour, who was also utilizing a pseudonym, "John Williams," stayed in this region for the spring season while gathering information to report to the Spanish. Lafitte and Latour then returned to New Orleans after scouting the area around Arkansas Post. The results of the expedition, written by Latour, included a warning to the Spanish Government that the westward expansion of Americans was inevitable. He described Americans as having "strength of character, courage, and skill in the use of guns rarely seen among civilized people." This conclusion coincided with Lafitte and Latour witnessing multiple American hunters and traders who had recently arrived in the Arkansas region beginning to move towards the Mexican border. Further advice was for the Spanish to establish the Louisiana boundary as far east as possible, and then to militarize the border to stop American Infiltrators. This advice was ultimately unheeded.

== Marriage and family ==
According to historian William C. Davis, in 1815 Lafitte began a public relationship with his mistress, Catherine (Catiche) Villard, a free woman of color. She was the sister of Marie Villard, the mistress of his brother, Pierre. Catiche became pregnant and gave birth to their son, Jean Pierre, on November 4, 1815. Catiche had given birth to a daughter named Marie on November 10, 1813. It's not known who her father was. Some speculate it was Jean.

After Jean's reported death in the mid-1820s, the widowed Catiche took up with Feliciano Ramos. They had two children together. Jean Pierre, her son with Jean Lafitte, died at 17 during a cholera epidemic in New Orleans in October 1832. Catiche died July 2, 1858, around the age of 65.

Another account says Lafitte married Christina Levine at the age of seventeen. They had 3 children together: Jean Antoine Lafitte, Lucien Jean Lafitte, and Denise Jeanette Lafitte. Christina died after the birth of their daughter. After his three children were grown, Lafitte fell sick in his 50s.

He was nursed back to health by Emma Hortense Mortimer. They married and had two sons together, Jules Jean and Glenn Henri. Lafitte possibly took an assumed name, John Lafflin, and may have given that surname to his younger two sons.

== End of Campeche ==
In 1821, the schooner USS Enterprise was sent to Galveston to remove Lafitte from the Gulf. One of the pirate's captains had attacked an American merchant ship. Lafitte agreed to leave the island without a fight, and on May 7, 1821, departed on The Pride. His men burned the Maison Rouge, fortress, and settlement. Lafitte reportedly took immense amounts of treasure with him, and was accompanied by his mulatta mistress and an infant son. Maison Rouge was long believed to have stood at 1417 Harborside Drive, near the Galveston wharf, but the foundations there have been dated to the 1870s.

== Later years ==
Most of his men had believed that Lafitte had a valid privateering commission although there was confusion as to which country had issued it. Two weeks after setting sail, they captured a Spanish ship, which they sent to Galveston, hoping the Longs would smuggle the goods to New Orleans. Lafitte's men buried some of the cargo on the island and ran the captured vessel aground, but an American patrol spotted the ship and, after investigating, discovered the buried cargo. Several of Lafitte's men were arrested and convicted of piracy. (Note: These men were pardoned after testifying that they had deserted from Lafitte's ship in Galveston when they discovered that it did not have a valid privateering commission. (Davis (2005), p. 436).)

The remainder of the crew rejoined Lafitte, who finally acknowledged that he did not have a valid commission. He said his ships would sail as pirates. Almost half of the combined crew refused to sail as pirates; Lafitte allowed them to leave aboard his largest ship, the brig General Victoria. That night his remaining men reboarded the General Victoria and destroyed its masts and spars, crippling the ship, but they left the crew unharmed. (Note: After more than two weeks, the disabled General Victoria was rescued by an American ship. The starving crew members were given rewards for having taken it from a pirate. (Davis (2005), p. 439).)

Lafitte and his men continued to take Spanish ships in the Gulf of Mexico and often returned to Galveston or the barrier islands near New Orleans to unload cargo or take on supplies arranged by Pierre. The congressional delegation in Louisiana began to demand that the federal government do something to halt the smuggling, and more US Navy ships were sent to the Gulf. Their patrols and interventions reduced the number of active pirates in the region. In October or November 1821, Lafitte's ship was ambushed as he attempted to ransom a recent prize. After first escaping with some crew, he and his men were captured and jailed. On February 13, 1822 he escaped, likely with outside help.

Over the next few months, Lafitte established a base along the coast of Cuba, where he bribed local officials with a share of the profits. In late April 1822, Lafitte was captured again after taking his first American ship. The American warship that captured him turned Lafitte over to the local authorities, who promptly released him. When Lafitte and other pirates operating in the area began attacking merchant ships carrying legal goods to Cuba, they angered Cuban officials. By the end of 1822, Cuba had banned all forms of sea raiding.

In June 1822, Lafitte approached the officials in Great Colombia, whose government under General Simón Bolívar had begun commissioning former privateers as officers in its new navy. Lafitte was granted a commission and given a new ship, a 43-ton schooner named General Santander in honor to Vice-president General Francisco de Paula Santander. For the first time, Lafitte was legally authorized to take Spanish ships.

Lafitte continued to patrol the shipping lanes around Cuba. In November 1822, he made news in the American press after escorting an American schooner through the pirate-infested area and providing them with extra cannonballs and food.

In February 1823, Lafitte was cruising off the town of Omoa, Honduras, on his schooner General Santander. Omoa was the site of the largest Spanish fort in Central America, built to guard the Spanish silver shipments from the mines of Tegucigalpa to overseas destinations. Lafitte attempted to take what appeared to be two Spanish merchant vessels on the night of February 4. It was cloudy with low visibility. The Spanish ships appeared to be fleeing but at 10:00 pm turned back for a frontal counterattack against Lafitte's ship. The Spanish ships were heavily armed privateers or warships and returned heavy fire.

Wounded in the battle, Lafitte is believed to have died just after dawn on February 5, 1823. He was buried at sea in the Gulf of Honduras. (Note: This account of Lafitte's death is not accepted by all historians. Ramsay believes that Lafitte died of a fever in 1826 or 1827 on Isla Mujeres just northeast of the Yucatán Peninsula. (Ramsay (1996), pp. 129–133.) Davis recounts a similar story but maintains that the man who died on the island was Pierre Lafitte and that the death occurred in late 1821. (Davis (2005), pp. 453-455.))

The Gaceta de Cartagena and the Gaceta de Colombia carried obituaries that noted, "the loss of this brave naval officer is moving." No American newspaper published an obituary of him.

Two amateur historians from Lincolnton, North Carolina have written a book claiming that Lafitte actually faked his death in 1823 and eventually changed his name to Lorenzo Ferrer, moving first to Mississippi and then Lincolnton, where Ferrer died in 1875. This claim has not been endorsed by any mainstream historians.

== Legacy ==
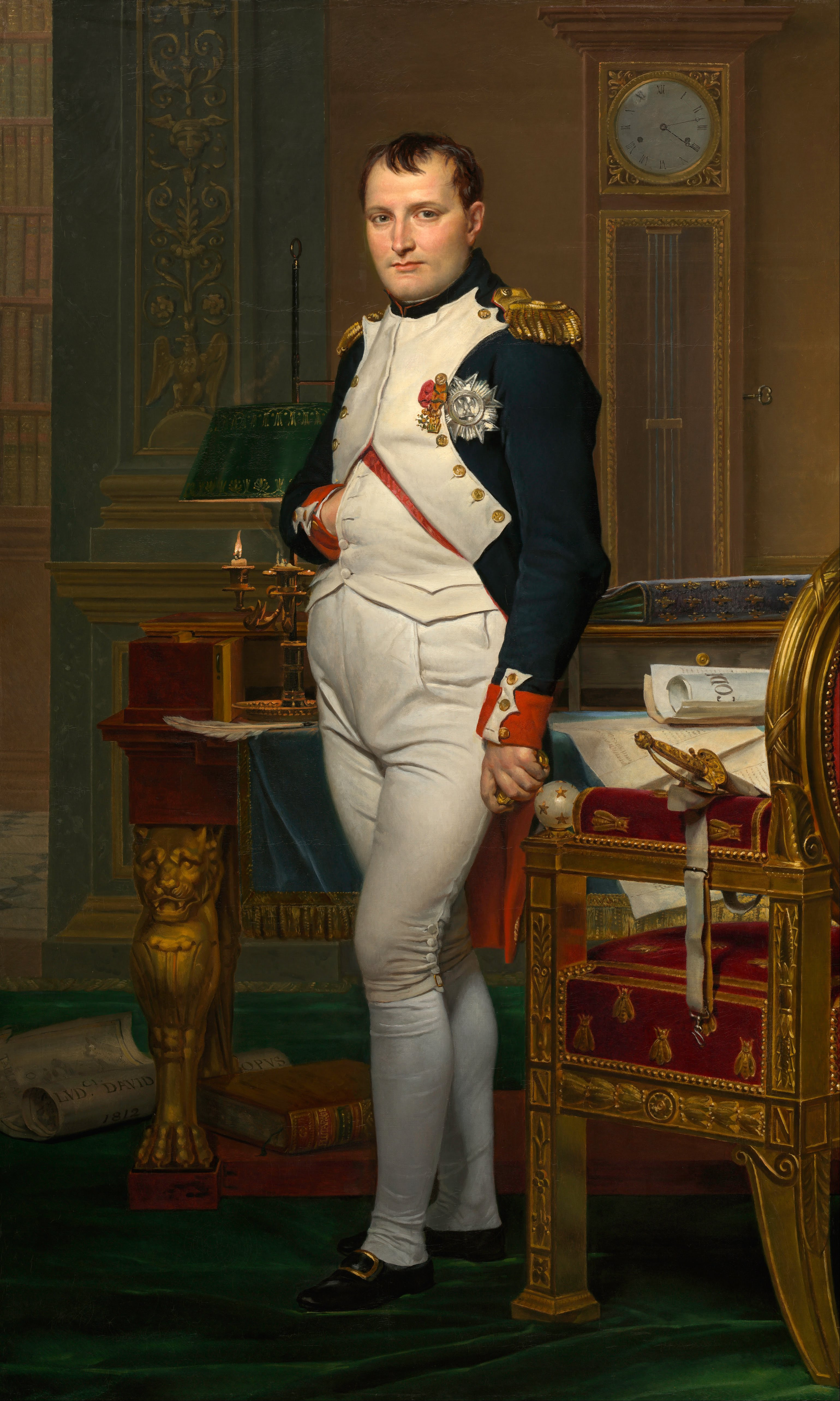
A rumor claimed that Lafitte rescued French Emperor Napoleon (pictured) from exile on the isolated island of Saint Helena and both of them ended their days in Louisiana. No evidence supports it.

Davis writes that Lafitte's death in 1823 prevented his becoming obsolete; by 1825 piracy had been essentially eradicated in the Gulf of Mexico, and "the new world of the Gulf simply had no room for [his] kind." Given his legendary reputation, there was much speculation about whether, or how, Lafitte had died. Rumors abounded that he had changed his name after leaving Galveston and disappeared, that he was killed by his own men shortly after leaving Galveston, or that he had rescued Napoleon and that both had died in Louisiana. In 1843, Mirabeau B. Lamar investigated many of the Lafitte stories and concluded that, while there were no authentic records of death, Lafitte was likely dead.

Ramsay compares the numerous legends related to the life and death of Jean Lafitte to those about King Arthur and Robin Hood. Lafitte is rumored to have buried treasure at many locations, including Galveston and sites along coastal Louisiana, such as Contraband Bayou in Lake Charles. Ramsay believes that over time, almost "every foot of Grande Isle has been spaded for pirate gold". In 1909, a man was given a six-year prison sentence for fraud after swindling thousands of dollars from people, by claiming that he knew where the Lafitte treasure was buried and taking their money for the promise to find it.

- Two fishing communities in Jefferson Parish, Louisiana, along Bayou Barataria, were named after him: Jean Lafitte, whose town hall is on Jean Lafitte Boulevard; and a census-designated place (CDP) called Lafitte.
- Jean Lafitte National Historical Park and Preserve, about 25 miles from New Orleans, was named for him.

== Representation in popular culture ==
=== New Orleans tourism ===
Lafitte's Blacksmith Shop is named after him. Located on Bourbon Street, it is associated with Lafitte, who may have spent time there in his earlier years. He was said to use it as a base for arranging the transfer of smuggled goods. His brother Pierre Lafitte was a blacksmith.

Constructed in the 1720s, the structure stands today as possibly the oldest building in the United States housing a bar (Lafitte's Blacksmith Shop Bar).

=== Literature ===
Numerous novels and stories refer to Lafitte's exploits.

- Many Americans believed that Lord Byron's epic poem The Corsair (1814) was based on the life of Lafitte; the work sold over 10,000 copies on its first day of publication, and was influential for the following century.
- The Memoirs of Lafitte, or The Baratarian Pirate; a Narrative Founded on Fact (1826), was a novella published anonymously and the first fiction to feature Lafitte.
- In Charles Sealsfield's novel Tokeah; or the White Rose (1829, rev. The Indian Chief; or, Tokeah and the White Rose, 1829), Jean Lafitte plays a key role.
- Charles Gayarre wrote the first serious biography of Lafitte, Historical Sketch of Pierre and Jean Lafitte, the Famous Smugglers of Louisiana (1883). Other biographies followed.
- Lyle Saxon wrote the novel Lafitte the Pirate (1930).
- Ruby Lorraine Radford published a children's story, “Victor and the Pirate: A Story of New Orleans During the War of 1812” (1947), featuring a child who encourages Lafitte to defend New Orleans.
- Lee Falk's Phantom comic strip story, "The Vault of Missing Men" (1979–1980), pitted Jean Lafitte against one of the historical Phantoms. The Phantom eventually married Lafitte's (fictional) sister Jeanette. Falk wrote that Lafitte was buried in a special vault in the Skull Cave, thus rewriting the details of his death.
- In the second book (1984) of the Scary Stories to Tell in the Dark children's trilogy, Confederate blockade runner captain Louis Billings is said to catch sight of the ghost of Lafitte's ship, the Pride, describing it as "a strange, old fashioned schooner with a big black flag" that was "afire with a sort of weird, pale blue light that lighted up every nook and cranny of her".
- Simon Hawke uses the young Lafitte as a minor character in his science-fiction novel The Pimpernel Plot (1984), set in Paris in 1791. He features Lafitte as an adult in his sequel, The Nautilus Sanction; the Time Commandos visit Barataria.
- Poppy Z. Brite's 1991 short story "The Sixth Sentinel," collected in Wormwood, features Lafitte as the narrator. He is a ghost enamored of a beautiful stripper whom he calls Hard Luck Rosalie. He tries to persuade her to dig up some of his treasure so that they can be together.
- In Image Comics's WildC.A.T.s, issue 20 (1995), Jean Lafitte is revealed to be a daemonite alien invader named Hightower.
- In the popular Japanese manga/anime series One Piece (1997), the character Lafitte is named after Jean Lafitte.
- Chilean author Isabel Allende used the historic Lafitte as a figure in her novel Zorro (2005), based on an American hero of that name from pulp fiction.
- French comics script-writer Marc Bourgne and Franck Bonnet (artist) created a series called Les pirates de Barataria (Glénat éditeur, Paris, 2009)
- Jean Laffite is a character in the historical fiction novels Theodosia and the Pirates: The Battle Against Britain (2013) and Theodosia and the Pirates: The War Against Spain (2014), by Aya Katz.
- Jean Lafitte is a character in the (2014) science-fiction, mystery novel Atlantic Pyramid by Michelle E. Lowe.
- Tom Cooper uses Lafitte's name and treasure in his novel The Marauders (2015).
- Suzanne Johnson features a living Lafitte in her urban fantasy series, The Sentinels of New Orleans.
- In Michael Punke's novel The Revenant (2002), Jean Lafitte and his pirate colony Campeche play an important role in the life of the protagonist.
- Jean Laffite is a character in the historical fiction novel Ashes & Ecstasy by Catherine Hart, published in 2000 by Leisure Books (first published November 1, 1985).

=== Film ===
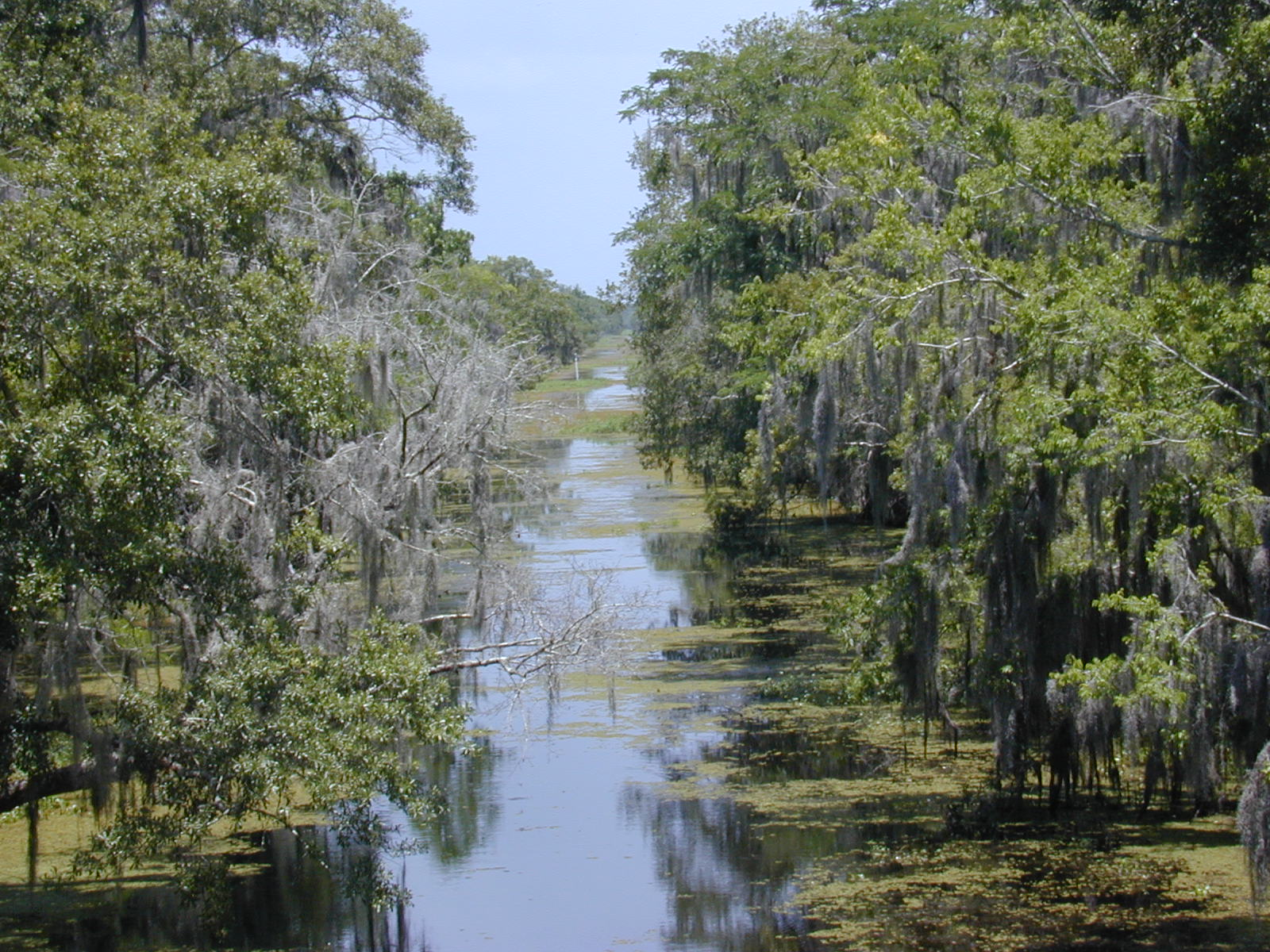
Part of the Barataria Preserve in Jean Lafitte National Historical Park and Preserve

- Saxon's novel was adapted for the Cecil B. DeMille movie The Buccaneer (1938), starring Fredric March as Lafitte.
- In 1950 Paul Henreid starred in another movie about Jean Lafitte entitled Last of the Buccaneers. It was directed by Lew Landers and produced by Sam Katzman.
- In 1958 Anthony Quinn directed a remake of The Buccaneer, starring Yul Brynner as Lafitte, and Charlton Heston as General Andrew Jackson.E.G. Marshall portraying Governor Claibourne, and Inger Stevens as Claibourne's adult daughter and Lafitte's love interest. In real life, Claibourne's daughter was an infant during the War of 1812.
- The Pirate Island of Jean Lafitte (1998), an 18-minute film directed by C. Grant Mitchell, is no longer screened year-round at the Pier 21 Theater in Galveston.

=== Television ===
In a fifth-season episode of the long-running Western series Bonanza ("The Gentleman from New Orleans") an elderly man (played by John Dehner) claiming to be Lafitte appears. (It is never established in the episode whether this claim is true or not.) Since the series is set in the early 1860s, this is clearly some 40 years or so after the historical Lafitte's reported death.

In the eighth episode of the short-lived 1982 show Voyagers!, time-travelers Phineas Bogg and Jeffrey Jones travel to 1798 Bahamas, where they meet Lafitte and help prevent him from being convicted of piracy. By doing so they help ensure he is later able to meet up with General Andrew Jackson and fulfill his historical role in the Battle of New Orleans in the War of 1812.

=== Lafitte's Journal ===
In 1948, John Andrechyne Laflin approached the Missouri Historical Society with a French-language manuscript he claimed was a journal Lafitte kept from 1845 until 1850. When the historical society could not authenticate the claim, Laflin approached Louisiana author Stanley Arthur. He wrote Jean Laffitte: Gentleman Rover, based on the journal.

In 1958, Laflin self-published an English translation of the journal. He refused to allow anyone else to see the original documents until 1969, when he sold them to a professional document dealer. The paper and ink were analyzed and confirmed to be of mid-19th-century origin. An archivist for Bexar County, Texas, declared the papers to be authentic.

In 1980, the manuscript was donated to the Sam Houston Regional Library and Research Center in Texas. For the first time, it was made available for research. Many researchers noticed a similarity between John Laflin's handwriting and the writing in the journal. Handwriting analysis experts affirmed that conclusion. Laflin had been previously accused of forging letters purportedly from Abraham Lincoln, Andrew Jackson, and Davy Crockett. Most historians now believe the Lafitte journal to be a forgery. (Note: Ramsay believes the documents were written by Laflin's ancestor, Matthew Laflin (1803–1854), who may have convinced his descendants that he was Jean Lafitte.(Ramsay (1996), pp. 151–2.))

=== Role-playing game ===
- Call of Cthulhu's New Orleans source book has Jean Lafitte alive and organizing global occult activity in 1920s New Orleans.
- Nancy Drew: Legend of the Crystal Skull (PC 2007) uses Jean Lafitte as a code to call a New Orleans secret society to order.

=== Breakfast cereal advertising mascot ===
- In the 1960s and 70s a barefoot cartoon pirate named Jean LaFoote appeared in animated television advertisements for the breakfast cereal Cap'n Crunch.

=== Disneyland ===
Disneyland memorializes Lafitte with a ship anchor monument and accompanying plaque in New Orleans Square. The Pirates of the Caribbean ride has a boat dock labeled LaFitte's Landing.

== See also ==
- List of pirates
- Privateering
  - Letter of marque
- List of people pardoned or granted clemency by the president of the United States

== Sources and bibliography ==
=== In English ===
- Davis, William C. (2005), The Pirates Laffite: The Treacherous World of the Corsairs of the Gulf, Harcourt Books, ISBN 978-0-15-100403-4
- Houdaille, Jacques (1956) "Frenchmen and Francophiles in New Spain from 1760 to 1810", The Americas, Vol. 13, No. 1, pp. 1-29.
- Ingersoll, Charles Jared. History of the second war between the United States of America and Great Britain: declared by act of Congress, the 18th of June, 1812, and concluded by peace, the 15th of February, 1815 Vol.2, Lippincott, Grambo & Co., 1852
- Nicolas, Paul Harris (1845). Historical Record of the Royal Marine Forces, Volume 2 [1805–1842]. London: Thomas & William Boone. OCLC 758539027
- Nickell, Joe (2005), Detecting Forgery: Forensic Investigation of Documents, University Press of Kentucky, ISBN 978-0-8131-9125-6
- Ramsay, Jack C. (1996), Jean Laffite: Prince of Pirates, Eakin Press, ISBN 978-1-57168-029-7
- Ramsdell, Charles, Jr. (1940), Why Jean Lafitte Became A Pirate, The Southwestern Historical Quarterly, Vol. 43, No. 4, pp. 465-471.
- Wilson, Reginald (2005), "When Was Laffite's Journal Written?" The Laffite Society Chronicles vol 11. no. 2, pp. 23-26.

=== In French ===
- Blond, Georges (1985), Moi Laffite, dernier roi des flibustiers. Paris, Éditions Albin Michel
- Kent, Madeleine Fabiola (1957), Jean Laffite, corsaire. Paris Éditions Calmann-Lévy
- Calvet, Louis-Jean (1998), Baratia. Paris Éditions Plon
- Saby, Claude-Alain (2016), 1815 : Les Naufragés de l'Empire aux Amériques, Chassieu, ISBN 9781326898267

=== In Spanish ===
- Rubio Mañé, Ignacio (1938, 1984) Los Piratas Laffite Mexico
