= Cafe Lafitte in Exile =

Gay bar in New Orleans, Louisiana, US

Coordinates: 29.9604°N 90.0642°W

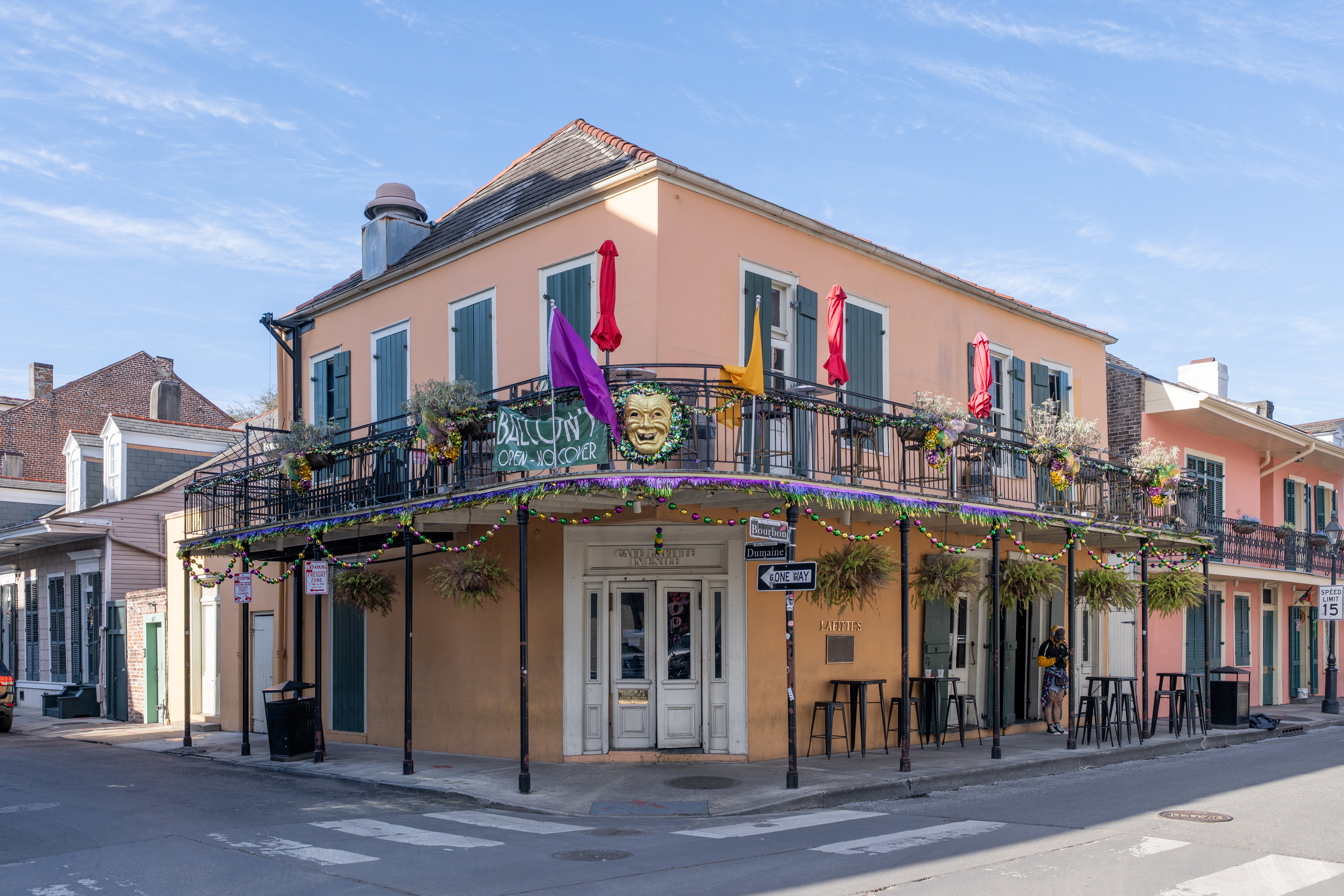
Cafe Lafitte in Exile on Bourbon Street in New Orleans, opened in 1933, claims to be the oldest gay bar in the United States.

Cafe Lafitte in Exile is a bar in New Orleans' French Quarter that has operated continuously since 1933. It claims to be the oldest continuously operating gay bar in the United States (along with White Horse Inn in Oakland, California, which has also operated since 1933).

== Name ==
Cafe Lafitte bar was first opened in Lafitte's Blacksmith Shop, a historic building at 941 Bourbon Street. When business owner Tom Caplinger was forced to vacate that location, he reopened at 901 Bourbon Street and named the new bar Cafe Lafitte in Exile.

== History ==
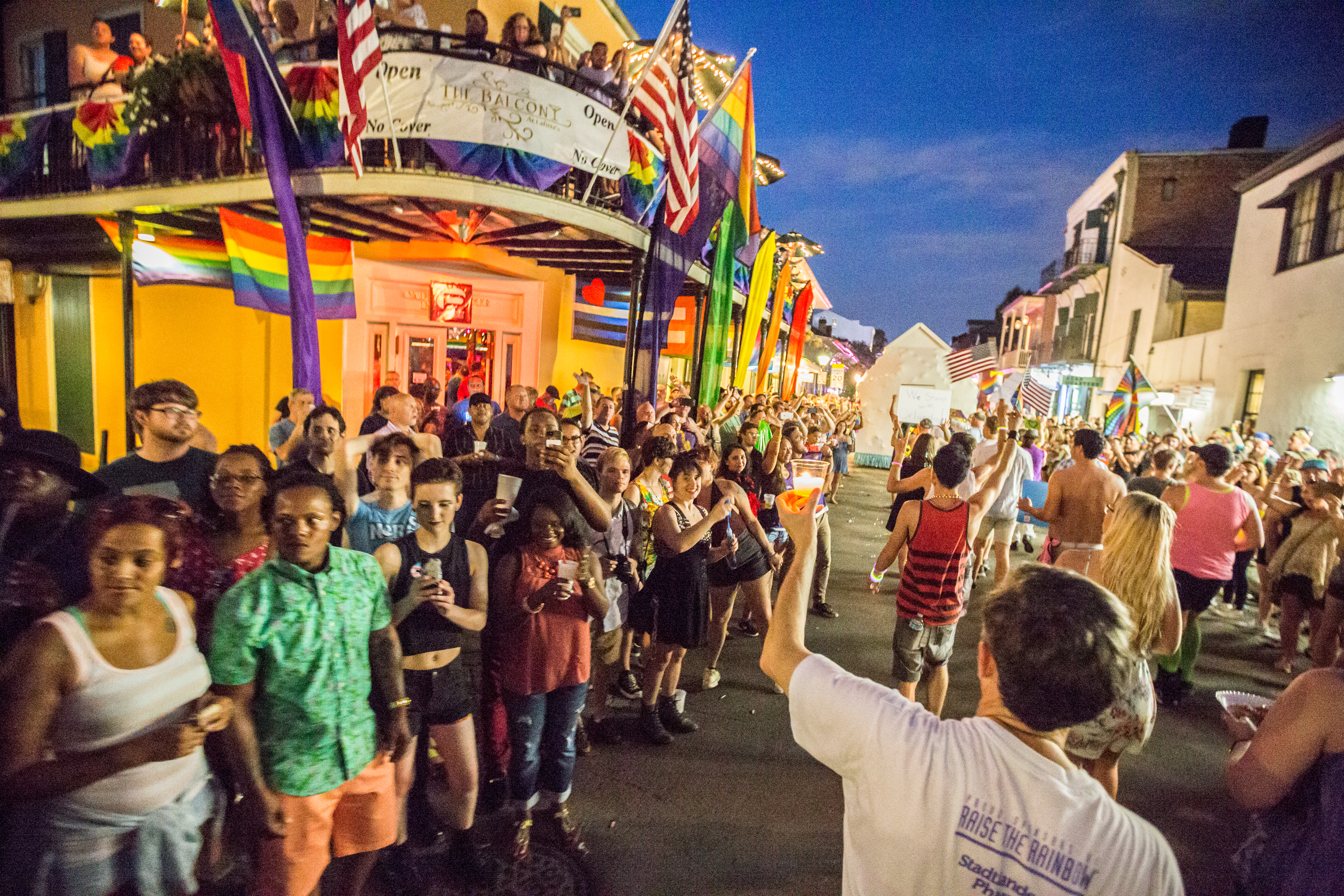
During the New Orleans Pride Parade, 2016

The bar is open seasonally 24 hours a day and has had influential guests including Tennessee Williams and Truman Capote. Operating since the end of Prohibition (albeit in two different locations) the bar claims to be the oldest gay bar in operation in the United States. The original Cafe Lafitte opened in the building that had been the noted pirate Jean Lafitte's blacksmith business in the 18th century. This building is now called Lafitte's Blacksmith Shop. In its early days, the bar was managed by Mary Collins, a lesbian, and drew a mixed crowd of lesbians, homosexuals and heterosexuals. In the 1950s, during rising tension between the club and the landlord, manager Tom Caplinger moved the club to the building where it is now located. At the grand reopening party in 1953, patrons arrived costumed as their favorite 'exile', including people like Oscar Wilde, Dante, and Napoleon.

In 1954, author John Steinbeck wrote an article about Tom Caplinger and Cafe Lafitte for the Saturday Evening Post, describing Caplinger as "an uninhibited, unkempt scholar, whose laissez-faire policy of running a gin mill can only be termed unique."

On September 28, 1958, Fernando Rios, a Mexican tour guide, was killed after leaving the bar with John Farrell, a student from Tulane University. Farrell had earlier in the night expressed to his friends that he wanted to "roll a queer" (a slang term meaning to rob a gay man), and he assaulted Rios in an alley of the St. Louis Cathedral after leaving the bar with him. He was acquitted of the murder by a jury.

== Ghost stories ==
In the book Queer Hauntings, Ken Summers writes that bar patrons claim to have occasionally seen the ghosts of deceased individuals who were fond of the bar as well as a "frisky" ghost named Mr. Bubbly who pinches people on their rear ends.

== See also ==
- List of LGBTQ bars
