= White Horse Inn (Oakland, California) =

Among the oldest gay bars still in operation

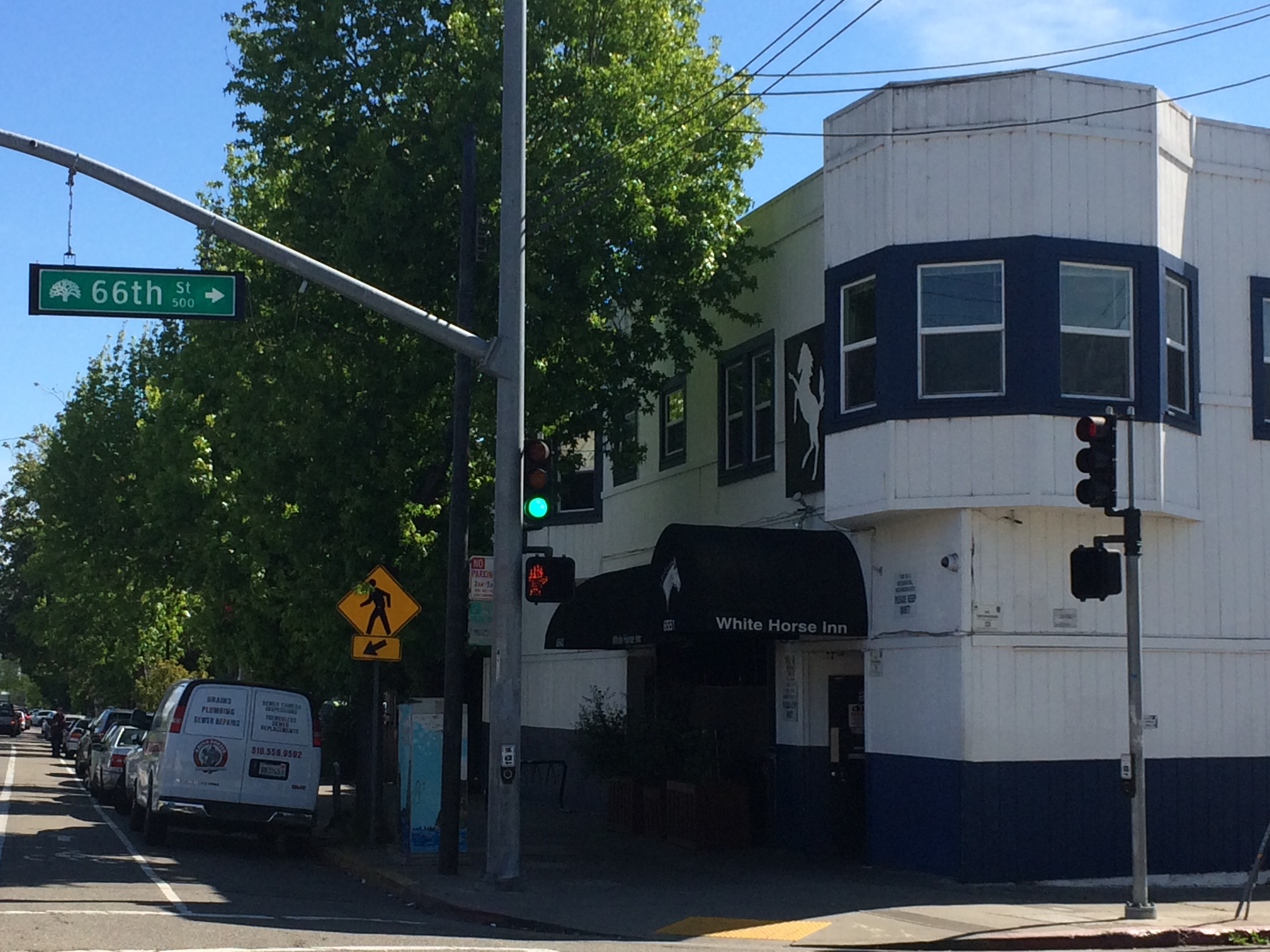
- Interactive map of White Horse Inn

Restaurant information
- Established: 1933
- Location: 6551 Telegraph Avenue, Oakland, Alameda, California, 94609, United States
- Coordinates: 37.85184070723647°N 122.26046669814927°W
- Website: whitehorse.bar

The White Horse Inn is a gay bar located at 6551 Telegraph Avenue in Oakland's Bushrod Park neighborhood. It officially opened in 1933 but is rumored to have operated as a gay speakeasy since before the end of Prohibition. It is said to be the oldest continuously operating gay bar in the United States, along with Cafe Lafitte in New Orleans, Louisiana which has also operated since 1933. The White Horse is situated geographically near the Oakland-Berkeley border and in close proximity to the University of California, Berkeley campus.

== History ==
Early history of the White Horse Inn is unclear; it officially states that it opened in 1933 following the passage of the 21st Amendment, although it is rumored to have operated as a speakeasy during the Prohibition period. Records show that local businessman Abraham C. Karski, founder of the Grand Lake Theater, ordered the construction of the building and founded the bar. At its opening in the 1930s, the White Horse was not explicitly a gay bar but rather a "gay-friendly bar [with a] no-touching policy" and Chinese restaurant. Advertisements from the 1940s state that the restaurant offered "exotic Chinese dinners and distinctive American cuisine." It was likely frequented by factory and port workers from nearby industrial centers as well as soldiers and sailors, especially during the Great Depression and World War II. The bar's small distance to the local university meant many students visited the bar; a patron who began attending the White Horse Inn in 1948 says the bar had a "reputation for being Cal's gay life."

Police raids began targeting gay and lesbian bars in the San Francisco Bay Area intensely from the 1950s onward. A variety of laws including "public morals" and sexual perversion ordinances were used to harass bars and their patrons. This occurred in the midst of post-war politics and anti-gay attitudes which "associated gay men with poor morals and weak wills," placing homosexual perspectives in opposition to national policies. In 1961 and 1962, police shut down nearly half of all gay bars in San Francisco, and raids continued into the 1970s. San Francisco police often arrested men leaving bars, demanded "extortion payments" from bars, and forcefully revoked liquor licenses. However, unlike other bars in the region, the White Horse Inn was never raided by police. The White Horse Inn thus served as a sanctuary for gays and lesbians in the area.

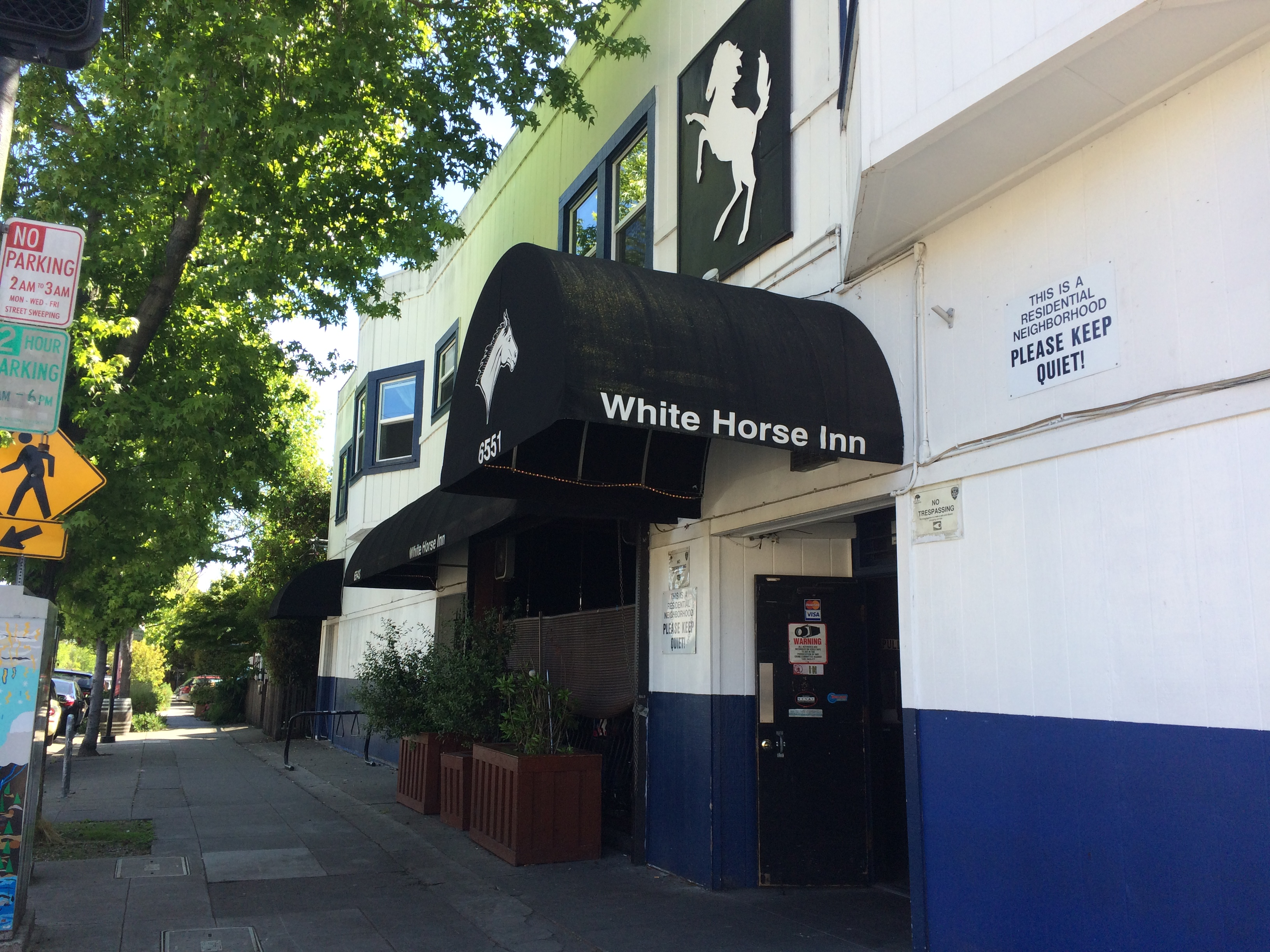
Close up of patio entrance.

Oakland and Berkeley became a prominent site for activism by the 1960s and 1970s. For example, the Free Speech Movement led marches down Telegraph Avenue and the Berkeley chapter of the Gay Liberation Front were founded during this time. Though the White Horse Inn was "never a hotbed of political action," "protesters and hippies" frequently met here. One patron noted many visitors had "long hair [and] attitude," and held views against the Vietnam War. In September 1970, the bar witnessed a sit-in protest and boycott because the bar refused to distribute Gay Sunshine, a gay liberation-oriented newspaper, and prohibited gay couples from showing physical affection. Berkeley GLF founder Nicholas F. Benton instead hosted "People's Alternative" dance parties as a response to what radical activists saw as the "cynical and apolitical" atmosphere of the White Horse Inn. Radical activists saw bars like the White Horse as "symbols of oppression, rather than as safe harbors." Resolution to the September protests came when the bar met some of the protestors' concessions including permitting slow dancing, reversing bans on over one hundred GLF members, and allowing distribution of Gay Sunshine.

In August 2018, the crosswalks outside the White Horse were painted rainbow by an unofficial group to support LGBTQ+ rights.

== Culture and legacy ==
The White Horse Inn is widely renowned as one of the most notable and significant gay bars in the country. A variety of publications – especially gay and lesbian directories and journals – include and celebrate the White Horse in their listings. Betty and Pansy's Severe Queer Review of San Francisco, a comprehensive collection of Bay Area queer knowledge, says that the White Horse should be part of the "basic queer East Bay survival kit." In 2014, the National Park Service announced its initiative to study and commemorate LGBT history. The White Horse Inn is listed among the list of places of historic significance to be studied.

The bar features a jukebox and karaoke, pool tables, and a dance floor with a disco-ball, among other things. It is often noted as being tamer in comparison to other Bay Area bars. News articles often state that "it's never been particularly raunchy" nor is it "heavy on the cruising." One local drag king, who performs at the bar describes the White Horse as a "sort of a time-capsule divey gay bar" and "old-school gay." The bar has hosted wet t-shirt and underwear contests, "beer busts," drag shows, watch parties, and more.

Descriptions of its clientele differ. One sociologist in 1975 stated that the bar was "diverse," receiving patronage from its similarly diverse surrounding populations, while a publication in 1983 described it as "a mixed crowd" in terms of gender but "primarily white." In the 1970s, the White Horse Inn was home to a Women's Night with a "healthy tradition of cruising and flirting." Its proximity to a now-defunct lesbian feminist bookstore, Mama Bears, made it a popular locale for lesbian women.

The White Horse Inn has been a place of gathering for the gay and lesbian community, for example, during protests against the passage of Proposition 8 in California which outlawed gay marriage in 2008. In 2013, the bar joined boycotts against Russian vodka in response to a Russian "anti-gay propaganda law."

In October 2014, the White Horse Inn was used as a setting for the HBO show "Looking."

On June 16, 2016, shortly after the Orlando nightclub shooting, podcast The Memory Palace released the episode "A White Horse" narrating the history of the White Horse Inn and stressing the continuity and community it represented within the LGBTQ community. The episode is rebroadcast every year on or near the anniversary of the shooting.

== See also ==
- Gay bars in the United States
- List of LGBTQ bars
