= Hotel St. Pierre =

New Orleans hotel

Coordinates: 29°57′42.4″N 90°3′57″W

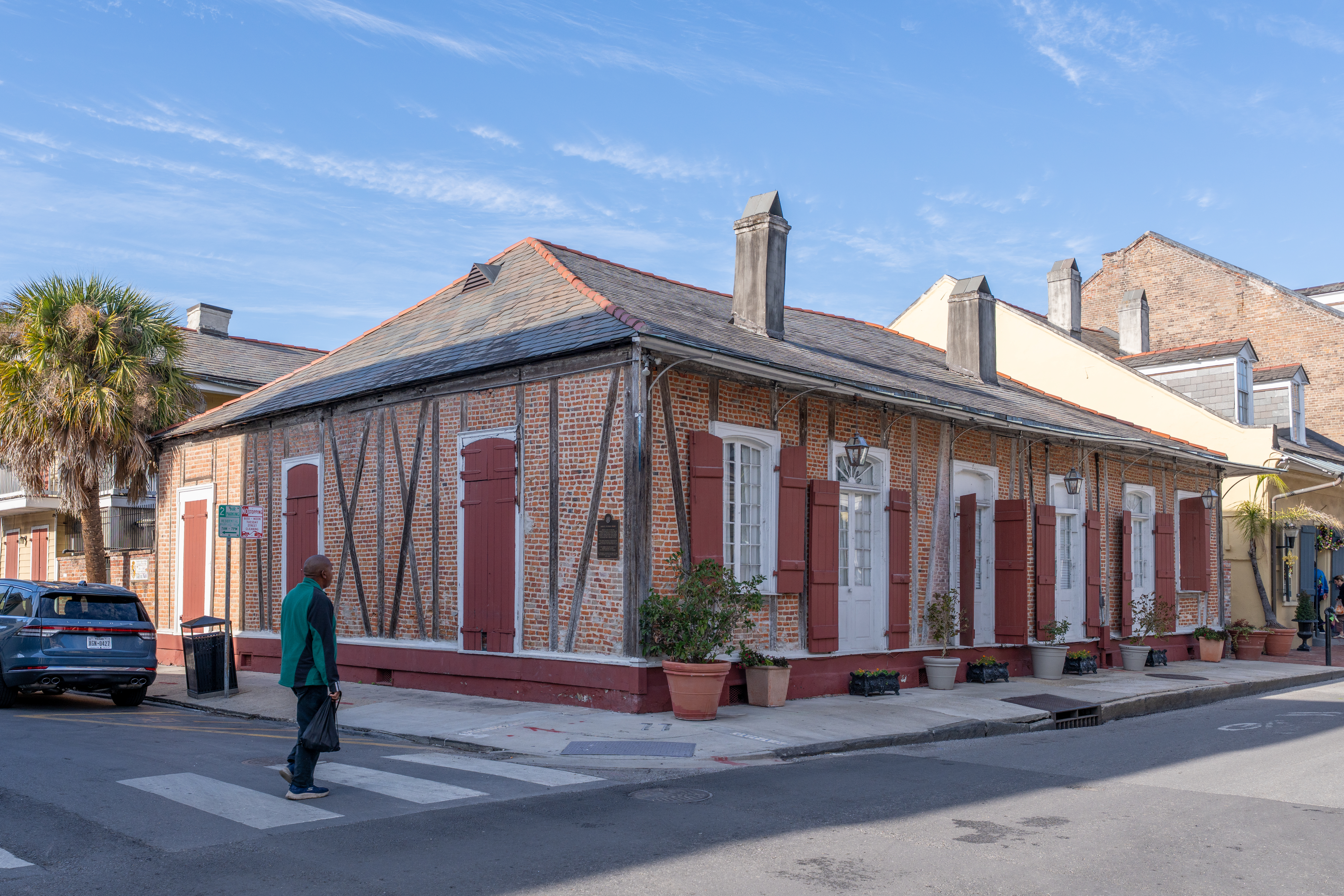
Gabriel Peyroux House, an example of briquette-entre-poteaux (brick-between-post) construction.

The Hotel St. Pierre is a collection of Creole cottages, many dating from the early 1780s, in the French Quarter of New Orleans, Louisiana, U.S.A. Its business address is 911 Burgundy Street.

The hotel property includes the Gabriel Peyroux House, erected in 1780 for Gabriel Peyroux de la Roche, a native of France. The house was constructed utilizing the French Colonial briquette-entre-poteaux (small-bricks-between-posts) architecture and is one of the few extant such examples in the city.

This cottage originally stood on the Peyroux plantation on nearby Bayou Road, but it was moved "to town" by the family. Gabriel Peyroux lived here with his wife, Maria Susana Caue. Maria’s father once owned the entire then-empty square which now includes the Hotel St. Pierre. The house and much of the square (city block) remained in the Peyroux family until 1850.

In 1961, the New Orleans Jazz Museum, the first jazz museum in the world, opened on this site at 1017 Dumaine Street. The collection included many musical instruments used by New Orleans jazz greats, including Louis Armstrong's first cornet. The Jazz Collection later relocated — in 1981, to a permanent home in the Louisiana State Museum's Old Mint Building.

== See also ==
- French Colonial architecture, where there is a photo of the Peyroux house
- Creole cottage, the architectural style
- Lafitte's Blacksmith Shop, a building similar to the Peyroux house
