= Pierre Lafitte =

French pirate

- Born: c. 1770; Possibly France or Biarritz
- Died: 1821; Dzilam de Bravo, Yucatán, Mexico
- Piratical career
- Type: Privateer, blacksmith, spy
- Rank: Captain
- Base of operations: New Orleans
- Battles: War of 1812; Battle of New Orleans

Pierre Lafitte (c. 1770–1821) was a pirate in the Gulf of Mexico and smuggler in the early 19th century. He also ran a blacksmith shop in New Orleans, his legitimate business. Pierre was historically less well known than his younger brother, Jean Lafitte. While not as much of a sailor as Jean, Pierre was the public face of the Lafitte operation, and was known for his wit and charm, in addition to his handling of the sale of smuggled goods.

Pierre Lafitte also spied for Spain and commanded artillery units. He died in 1821 near Dzilam de Bravo in the Yucatán Peninsula.

== Early life ==
Details of Pierre Lafitte's early life are scarce and often disputed. His younger brother Jean gave contradictory information about his birthplace, including the Breton cities of Saint-Malo and Brest. However, as Jean Lafitte's biographer, Jack C. Ramsay, stated, "this was a convenient time to be a native of France, a claim that provided protection from the enforcement of American law." Further contemporary accounts claim that Jean Lafitte was born in Orduña, Spain, or even Westchester, New York. Ramsay speculates that Lafitte was actually born in the French Caribbean colony Saint-Domingue (now Haiti).

It was common in the late 18th century for the adult children of the French landowners in Saint-Domingue to resettle in the Mississippi River Delta, which was also owned by France. Families with the surname Lafitte are mentioned in Louisiana documents dating as early as 1765. According to Ramsay, Lafitte, his younger brother, Jean, and their widowed mother sailed from Saint-Domingue to New Orleans, Louisiana (New Spain) in the 1780s. Approximately 1784, his mother married Pedro Aubry, a New Orleans merchant. Jean stayed with his mother while Pierre was raised by extended family elsewhere in Louisiana.

The biographer William C. Davis reports a different childhood. According to Davis's book, Lafitte was born in or near Pauillac, France and was the son of Pierre Lafitte and Marie LaGrange, who married in 1769. LaGrange died the following year, likely while she gave birth. The elder Pierre Lafitte remarried in 1775 to Marguerite Desteil; they had six children, including Jean Lafitte. The boys were likely given a basic education, and Pierre Lafitte later joined his father's trading enterprise.

The father died in 1796, and Davis speculates that the younger Pierre Lafitte journeyed to Saint-Domingue (later Haiti). In May 1802, Lafitte requested a passport so that he could go "to Louisiana to join one of his brothers." As the Haitian Revolution became more violent, French citizens began leaving the islands. Lafitte, probably accompanied by an infant son, left the island aboard a refuge ship in early 1803.

Lafitte's ship landed in New Orleans, which had originally been part of French Louisiana although it had become a Spanish possession for nearly 40 years. Records indicate that on March 21, 1803, Pierre Lafitte partnered with Joseph Maria Bourguignon to purchase a city lot, home, and outbuildings near Royal Street. The men were unable to pay their mortgage and returned the property three months later. In December 1803, Louisiana became a territory of the United States. The following year, Lafitte moved to Baton Rouge, which was in the Spanish-controlled West Florida.

== Barataria and War of 1812 ==
Along with his 'crew of a thousand men' (the number that he commanded was quite small, but the loose confederation that he and his brother ran caused the number of men engaged in their affairs to be substantial), Lafitte also receives credit for helping defend Louisiana from the British in the War of 1812, and Pierre is mentioned in several accounts of the Battle of New Orleans. His piracy was pardoned by President James Madison on February 6, 1815, by the aiding of Andrew Jackson during the battle.

The United States made the Louisiana Purchase in 1803. In January 1808, the government began to enforce the Embargo Act of 1807, which barred American ships from docking at any foreign port. That was problematic for New Orleans merchants, who had relied heavily on trade with Caribbean colonies of other nations. Pierre and Jean began to look for another port from which they could smuggle goods to local merchants.

They established themselves on the small and sparsely populated island of Barataria, in Barataria Bay. The bay was located beyond a narrow passage between the barrier islands of Grande Terre and Grande Isle. Barataria was far from the US naval base, and ships could easily smuggle in goods without being noticed by customs officials. Workers would reload goods into smaller batches onto pirogues, or barges, for transport through the bayous to New Orleans.

Jean claimed to command more than 3,000 men and provided them as troops for the Battle of New Orleans in 1815, which greatly assisted Andrew Jackson in repulsing the British attack. The actual number that he commanded was more likely a few dozen, but since they specialized in artillery, their effect was substantial. Lafitte reportedly conducted his operations in the historic New Orleans French Quarter. Jackson was informed of both Lafittes' gallant exploits at the Battle of New Orleans by Colonel Peter Ellis Bean, who then recruited the Lafittes to support the Mexican Republican movement.

Of the two brothers, Jean was more familiar with the naval aspects of their enterprise, and Pierre was more often involved with the commercial aspects. Pierre lived in New Orleans or at least maintained his household there with his mulatto lover, who bore him a very large family. Jean spent the majority of his time in Barataria in managing the daily hands-on business of outfitting privateers and arranging the smuggling of stolen goods. The most prized "good" was invariably slaves, especially after the outlawing of the international slave trade in the United States.

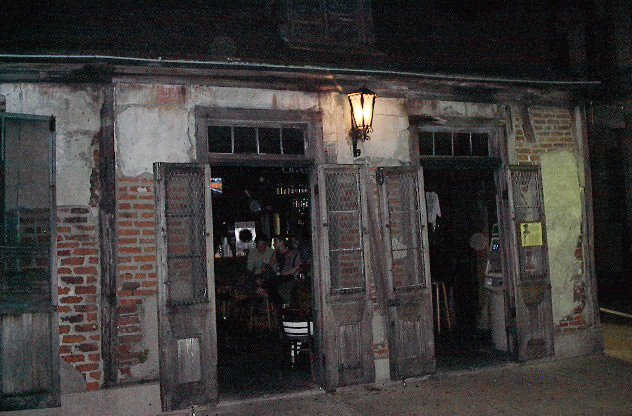
The building in New Orleans which housed Pierre Lafitte's blacksmith shop, now converted into a bar

In 1810, a Spanish slave ship en route to Pensacola was captured by privateers and its cargo sold in Louisiana. The shipowner launched an investigation and discovered the names of the men who had purchased the slaves. The sheriff of Ascension Parish appointed Lafitte a deputy marshal and sent him to recover the slaves. Lafitte served the arrest warrant and helped to round up the slaves. A provision in the Louisiana laws abolishing the slave trade called for illegally imported slaves to be confiscated and sold at auction, with half the profits going to the men who turned in the illegally-gotten slaves. For his work in that case, Lafitte received half the purchase price for each illegally purchased slave identified by him. Davis speculated that Lafitte had participated in the raid to try to close down the operations of the slave traders who were not operating through Barataria Bay.

== Galveston ==
After Jean was run out of New Orleans around 1817, Pierre remained in New Orleans but frequently visited the island of Galveston, Texas, to visit his brother.

While the Lafitte brothers were engaged in running the Galveston operation, one client with whom they worked considerably in the slave smuggling trade was Jim Bowie. The Lafittes were selling slaves at a dollar a pound, and Bowie would buy them at the Lafittes' rate and get around the American laws against slave trading by reporting his purchased slaves as having been found in the possession of smugglers. The law then allowed Bowie to collect a fee on the "recovered" slaves, and he would rebuy the slaves (essentially a "slave laundering" act) and then resell them to prospective buyers.

The Lafittes (Pierre, in particular) spied for Spain through agents in Cuba and in Louisiana. They often provided solid material, but the Lafittes in fact played both sides, American and Spanish, always with an eye to securing their own interests. No doubt, the charm of Pierre and his reputation as a man in the know figured heavily in the weight he was given by his immediate handlers, but he was never trusted by higher-up Spanish interests. While running the island of Galveston for personal benefit, Pierre Lafitte tried to induce Spain to assault the island. That would have enhanced his standing with Spain but caused minimal real losses to the Lafitte operations.

== See also ==
- Battle of New Orleans
- Dominique Youx
- Jean Lafitte
- Lafitte's Blacksmith Shop, New Orleans
- Letter of marque
- Privateering
- Renato Beluche
- List of people pardoned or granted clemency by the president of the United States
