= Killing of Fernando Rios =

1958 killing of a gay man in New Orleans

- Location: 29°57′29″N 90°3′49″W; New Orleans, Louisiana, U.S.
- Date: September 28, 1958; Between 2 and 3 a.m.
- Target: Fernando Rios
- Attack type: Assault; Hate crime
- Deaths: 1
- No. of participants: 3
- Motive: Gay bashing
- Coroner: Nicholas Chetta
- Accused: Alberto Calvo; David Drennan; John Farrell
- Charges: Murder during the commission of a robbery; Conspiracy to commit robbery; Simple robbery
- Verdict: Not guilty of murder; Guilty of conspiracy to commit robbery and simple robbery (Drennan and Farrell only)
- Convictions: Conspiracy to commit robbery and simple robbery
- Convicted: 2 (Drennan and Farrell)
- Litigation: A wrongful death claim was initiated by Rios's mother, but dismissed due to the statute of limitations
- Judge: J. Bernard Cocke (murder trial); George P. Platt (robbery trial)

On September 28, 1958, Fernando Rios, a 26-year-old Mexican tour guide and gay man, died due to injuries sustained during an assault he experienced the previous night in New Orleans, Louisiana, United States. The assault was perpetrated by John Farrell, a 20-year-old student at Tulane University, who was accompanied by fellow students Alberto Calvo and David Drennan.

Earlier in the night, Farrell had recommended to Calvo and Drennan that they rob a gay man, with Farrell targeting Rios at the Cafe Lafitte in Exile, a gay bar. The two left the bar together, with Farrell, accompanied by Calvo and Drennan, assaulting Rios in an alley of the St. Louis Cathedral, resulting in his death the next day. Following his death, the three individuals turned themselves in to the police, and pleaded not guilty to murder. The three were ultimately found not guilty, with their defense team employing a gay panic defense. Subsequent prosecution resulted in convictions on lesser charges, but did not result in any of the men serving jail time.

After the murder trial, which attracted a significant amount of local news coverage—much of which expressed a bias in support of the accused—the event largely faded from local memory. However, the 2017 publication of a book on the killing written by local LGBTQ historian Clayton Delery revived interest in the incident, leading to increased contemporary coverage of the event. Multiple sources have referred to the killing of Rios as an incident of gay bashing and a hate crime.

== Background ==
=== LGBTQ culture in New Orleans ===
Throughout the 20th century, New Orleans had been known for having a large LGBTQ population, particularly in the city's French Quarter neighborhood. In the early part of the century, urban decay in the area caused property prices to drop, prompting an influx of LGBTQ individuals that turned it into a gayborhood. By the 1950s, the French Quarter was widely regarded by residents of the city to be a place of vice, with a significant LGBTQ population and many dive bars, though the neighborhood was also a popular tourist attraction. While some tourists were drawn to the neighborhood in part because of its associations with vice and illicit activities, it also benefitted from its history and unique architecture.

Starting in the 1940s and going into the 1950s, there was a significant push from New Orleanians to clean up the French Quarter, with opinion pieces published in local newspapers highlighting the blighted status of the neighborhood. At the time, New Orleans's tourism industry was growing, and city officials were concerned that the visible LGBTQ community in the French Quarter could damage that industry. As a result, New Orleans Mayor deLesseps Story Morrison organized a "Committee on the Problem of Sex Deviates", which recommended that the city government take a more hostile stance towards the city's LGBTQ population, including an increase in the number of police raids on gay bars. In 1955, the superintendent of the New Orleans Police Department (NOPD), Provosty A. Dayries, publicly referred to homosexual people as the city's "Number One vice problem", further stating, "They are the ones we want to get rid of most." These actions in New Orleans can be viewed as part of the nationwide Lavender Scare, a moral panic regarding homosexual and other LGBTQ people in American society.

=== Racism and xenophobia in the 1950s ===
The 1950s also saw a vocal amount of anti-Mexican sentiment in the United States. The population of Mexicans in the United States had grown during World War II, in part due to government programs such as the Bracero Program, which brought in hundreds of thousands of Mexican workers during the war. However, following the war, xenophobia against Mexicans was widespread and culminated in part with Operation Wetback, a mass deportation program headed by the federal government that sent several thousand Mexicans in the United States back to Mexico. In addition to prejudice against Mexicans, the 1950s also saw several high-profile crimes against other minorities. In the area around New Orleans, this included several lynchings, including those of African Americans Mack Charles Parker and Emmett Till.

== Killing ==
=== Night of the killing ===
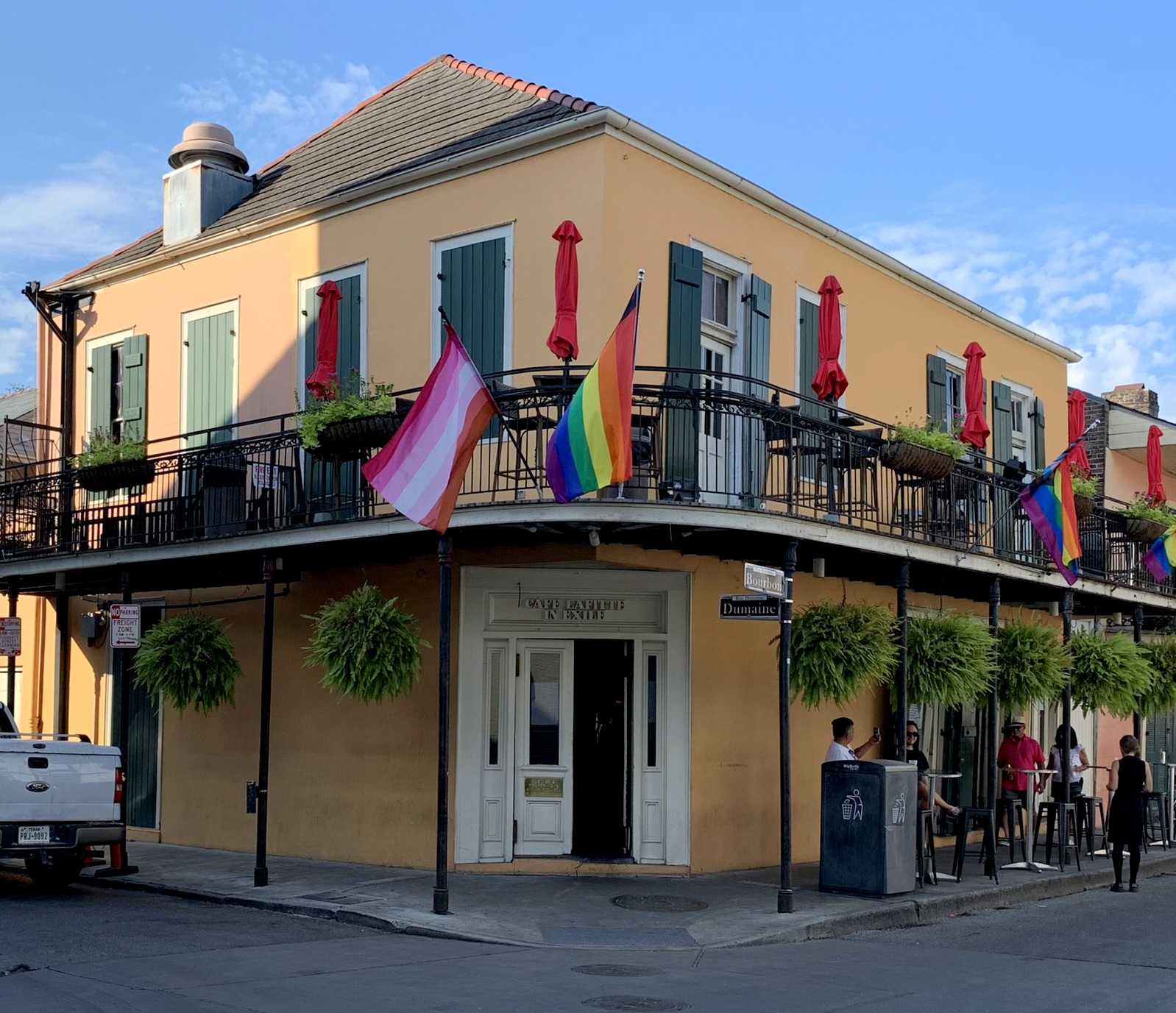
The Cafe Lafitte in Exile (pictured 2022) is a gay bar in the French Quarter of New Orleans.

In September 1958, a group of Mexican doctors and their wives were on a tour of the city that was being led by Fernando Rios, a 26-year-old tour guide from Mexico City. The group, including Rios, was staying at the Roosevelt Hotel. On the night of Saturday, September 27, after a day of showing the visitors around the city, Rios, a gay man, went to the French Quarter to enjoy the nightlife at the Cafe Lafitte in Exile, a gay bar on Bourbon Street. Rios was dressed in formal wear, including a dress shirt, necktie, and suit with faux-gold cufflinks, and he was carrying in his pockets his wallet, rosary, hotel key, and a note containing the name and address of a contact he had in Memphis, Tennessee. Rios had no friends or family members in New Orleans and he went to the bar alone.

Also at the bar that night was John S. Farrell. Farrell was a student at Tulane University, a prestigious Southern Ivy university located about 5 miles (8.0 km) from the French Quarter in Uptown New Orleans. Farrell had recently transferred to Tulane and had only been living in New Orleans for about two weeks at the time. He lived on campus with Alberto A. Calvo, a student from Panama. On the afternoon of September 27, the two of them drove from the campus to the local train station to pick up David P. Drennan, another Tulane student who was a friend of Calvo's, with the intention of hanging out in the city. This was the first time that Farrell had met Drennan, though all three individuals were members of the same fraternity. Drennan was 19 years old, while both Calvo and Farrell were 20.

Early in the night, Farrell recommended that the three of them "roll a queer", which was a slang term for robbing a gay man. However, the other two rejected the idea of gay bashing and instead went to a movie theater. Following the movie, the three went to the French Quarter, parking their car near the St. Louis Cathedral on Royal Street. The two went to Pat O'Brien's Bar and a steakhouse, where they all consumed alcoholic beverages. (Note: At the time, the legal drinking age in Louisiana was 18.) After midnight, Farrell again recommended that the three "roll a queer". Calvo and Drennan were less hesitant than earlier in the night, and shortly after 1:30 a.m., Farrell entered the Cafe Lafitte. Farrell told his two companions to wait outside while he found a victim. Once inside, he sat at the bar next to Rios. The two began to interact, during which time Farrell had two beers. Rios had offered to pay for the second one, which Farrell accepted. At around 2 a.m., the two left the bar, with Farrell saying he was parked nearby and that he could drive Rios back to the Roosevelt, which he said was on his way back to Tulane's campus. Additionally, according to a 2023 article in the French Quarter Journal publication, the two had planned for a "hook-up". Farrell led Rios towards the cathedral, with Calvo and Drennan trailing behind them from a distance. (Note: In a 2017 book, LGBTQ historian Clayton Delery states that it is unclear exactly what occurred immediately after Farrell and Rios left the bar. In statements given to police, Calvo, Drennan, and Farrell all stated that, after leaving the bar, Farrell introduced Rios to the other two and that the four of them proceeded towards their car. However, in later court proceedings, both Calvo and Drennan stated that, per a previous discussion with Farrell, he never introduced them to Rios and they instead trailed behind them as Farrell led Rios. While Farrell denied this series of events, Delery states that "This account ... seems more consistent with the event that followed".) According to Farrell, during their walk, Rios asked if he had ever "gone to bed with a man", which Farrell denied, further requesting that he not talk about that again.

=== Attack ===
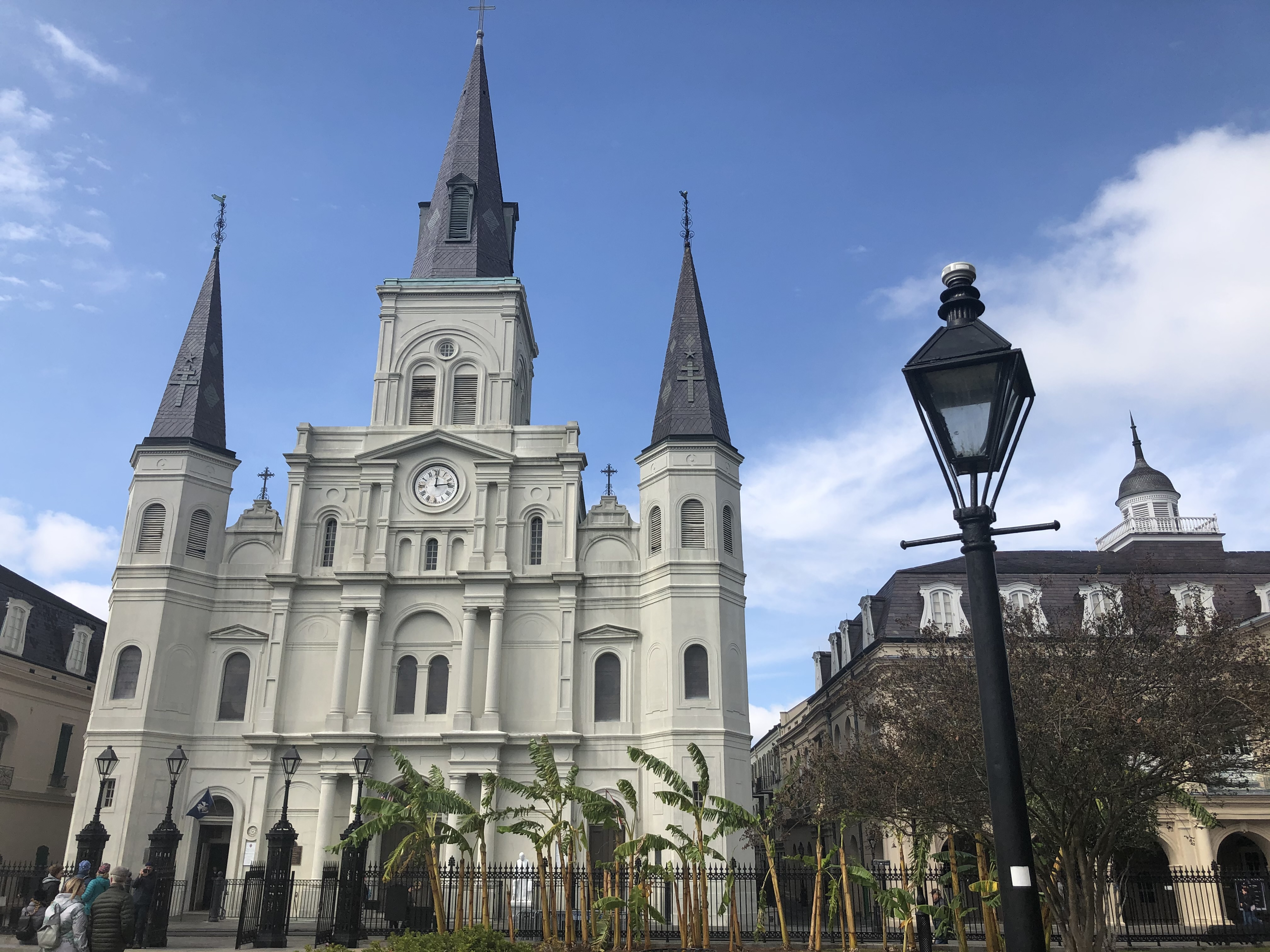
The attack took place in the alley between the Presbytere (right) and the St. Louis Cathedral.

While Farrell and his companions had parked on Royal Street, Farrell led Rios past that street and in front of the cathedral, maintaining a ruse that he was still looking for the car. Rios, believing that they would not be able to find the car, attempted to flag a taxi, but at that time, Farrell stated that he had remembered parking near the alley that they were standing in front of: Orleans Alley North, popularly known as Pere Antoine Alley, located between the cathedral and its rectory, the Presbytere. (Note: According to Delery, it is a popular misconception that the two individuals entered Orleans Alley South, which separated the cathedral from a building known as the Cabildo. This alley is popularly known as Pirate Alley, in part because the Cabildo houses one of the oldest prisons in the city. Delery states that the misconception may stem from a deliberate desire from contemporary sources to link the violence that occurred against Rios in the historical context of Pirate Alley rather than Pere Antoine Alley. Per Delery, "A passageway between a cathedral and a rectory—and one named in honor of a beloved priest—would be too sanctified a space in which to imagine such grotesque offenses. Better to place them in an alley already tainted by the suggestion of crime. One overlooked by the cathedral and the jail.") As a tour guide, Rios was probably familiar with the area and the alley, as it was a popular daytime thoroughfare for pedestrians located adjacent to Jackson Square, a focal point of the French Quarter. As the two of them walked down the alley, Farrell's companions were fixed on either end, with one on Royal Street and the other on Chartres Street, though in later testimony, Farrell said that he only saw Calvo, who was behind them. In later police testimony, Farrell claimed that Rios grabbed his penis while they were in the alley, prompting him to strike Rios "only once". Following this, his two companions showed up, though Farrell did not recall either of them doing anything as Rios called out for help. However, multiple other sources report that all three individuals were involved in the assault, with Rios being struck multiple times in his head and receiving several kicks to his abdomen. Ultimately, the attack left Rios unconscious and bleeding, and the three also took his wallet.

Following the attack, the three left the alley and made their way back to their car. At around 3 a.m., while still in the French Quarter, the group ran into two fellow Tulane students, who they told about the robbery. Afterwards, Drennan returned home while Farrell and Calvo went to Calvo's dormitory, where the two woke up his roommate and told him of their activities. They then went through the contents of the wallet, amounting to about $40 (equivalent to $446 in 2025) in American, Canadian, and Mexican currency, and destroyed any identifying information, burning Rios's identification cards. Starting the following morning, the three told several more students that they had beaten and robbed a gay man over the weekend, with several of the people they told characterizing their discussion of events as boastful.

Shortly before 6 a.m. on September 28, the unconscious Rios was discovered in the alley and taken by authorities to Charity Hospital. A police investigation into the matter commenced shortly thereafter. Rios never regained consciousness, and he died in the hospital at 5:21 p.m. The following morning, during an autopsy, the coroner, Nicholas Chetta, ruled the death a homicide and noted damage to several of Rios's internal organs, including his brain, heart, liver, and lungs. Additional injuries included subdural hematoma, facial lacerations, and multiple skull fractures and hemorrhages. The coroner also noted that Rios had "eggshell cranium", meaning that sections of his skull were abnormally thin and susceptible to more damage. Following the autopsy, his body was sent back to Mexico for burial.

== Legal proceedings ==
Television and radio news programs reported on Rios's death on Monday, September 29, with the first print record appearing in The Times-Picayune the following morning. That Monday, after Calvo, Drennan, and Farrell realized that Rios had died, the three met to discuss what they should do next. While the three initially considered telling a Catholic priest, who would be bound to secrecy by the seal of confession in the Catholic Church, they instead decided to tell an administrator at Tulane. The three talked to two deans, William Ray Forrester and John H. Stibbs, who advised the students to turn themselves in. On September 30, the three were arrested by the NOPD after admitting to beating and robbing Rios.

=== Police statements ===
In separate statements made to the police, the three recounted the same basic story, stating that they had gone to a movie theater, bar, and steakhouse, before going to the Cafe Lafitte because Farrell wanted another beer, with the other two staying outside. Following this, the four walked back as a group when Rios made an unwanted sexual advance towards Farrell. While Drennan and Farrell said he had grabbed his penis, Calvo said he did not see this occur. Following this, Farrell struck Rios and the three left, only to learn of his death later. According to LGBTQ historian Clayton Delery, the three made several notable omissions in their statements, including the wallet theft and Farrell's desire to "roll a queer" before entering the Cafe Lafitte. Per their statements, the only reason they were at that bar was because Farrell wanted a beer. Drennan also stated that he had heard Rios sexually proposition Farrell, asking him to come with him back to the Roosevelt, a claim which is not mentioned in Farrell's statement to the police. Additionally, while the men said that Farrell had struck Rios either only once or twice, the results of the autopsy indicate that Rios had most likely been struck many more times than just twice. Per Delery, Forrester, who was both a lawyer and dean of Tulane's Law School, may have guided the three in preparing their statements, which may explain some of the omissions.

=== Murder trial ===
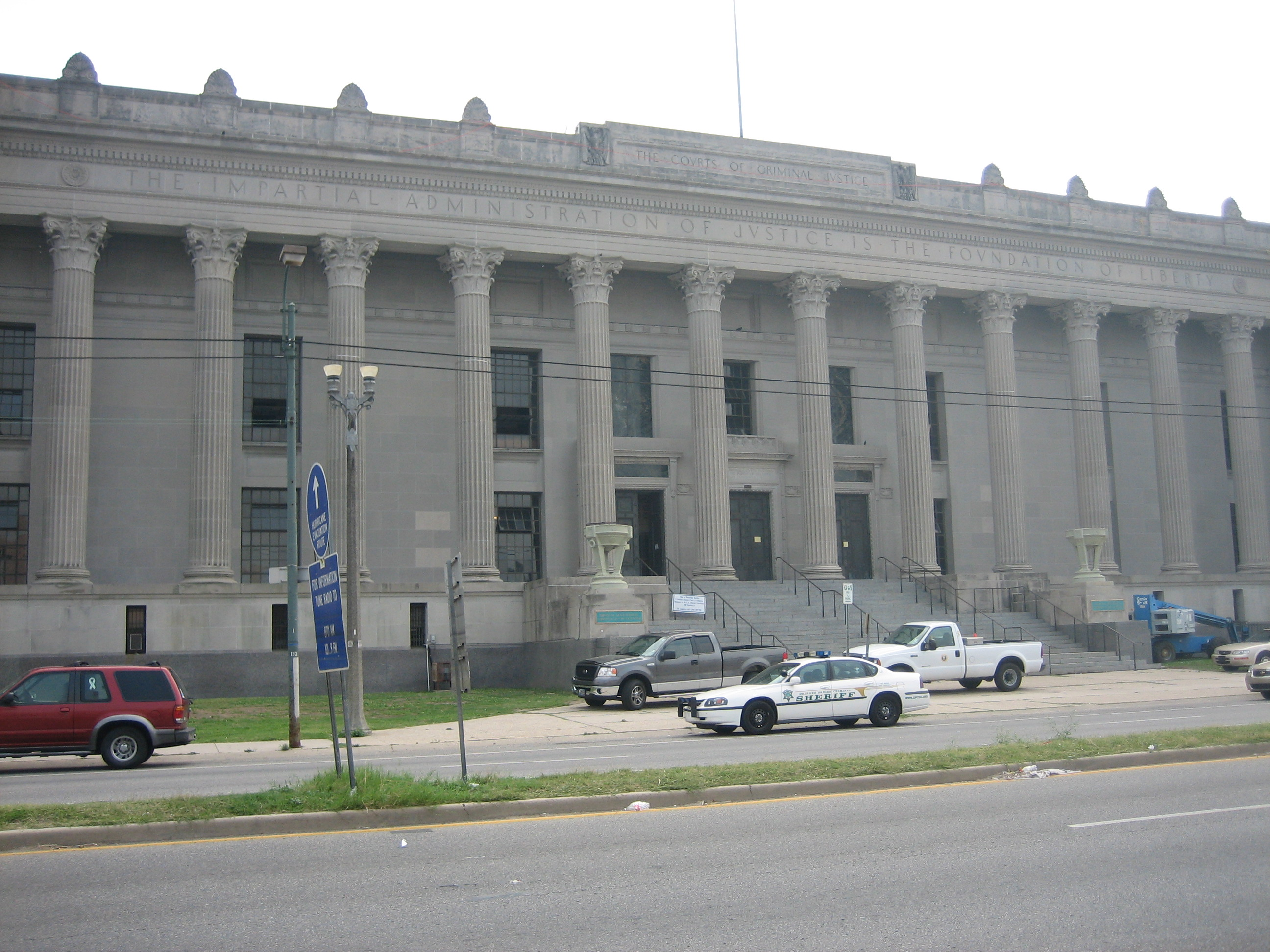
The Orleans Parish Criminal District Court, pictured 2007

District Attorney Richard A. Dowling of New Orleans, who described Rios's death as a "brutal murder", initiated prosecution against Calvo, Drennan, and Farrell for murder during the commission of a robbery. On October 20, 1958, the three pleaded not guilty to the charge of murder, and the following month, the judge overseeing the case, J. Bernard Cocke, granted a continuance. None of Rios's relatives were present for the trial, as his widowed mother and grandmother, whom he had financially supported, were unable to afford to travel to New Orleans. Concerned about a fair trial for Rios, the Mexican consulate in New Orleans retained an attorney, Jim Garrison, to assist the prosecution. Ultimately, however, Garrison, who would later succeed Dowling as the district attorney of New Orleans, dropped out of the case shortly after jury selection due to a case of influenza. Attorney Edward M. Baldwin served as Calvo's defense attorney, though the defense worked as a team. Prior to the trial, the defense submitted a request for a subpoena of Rios's possessions from his hotel room, hoping in part to find any physical evidence of his homosexuality to use against him in court, though no physical possessions were ever produced for the court. This was part of the defense team's strategy of damaging Rios's character by drawing attention to his sexuality and thus sway the jury to believe that what had occurred to him was in some way justified. Throughout the trial, local newspapers published content favoring the defendants, regularly publishing letters that expressed support for the accused.

Proceedings for the trial officially commenced on January 19, 1959, at the Orleans Parish Criminal District Court. That day, Dowling produced a list of 22 witnesses and announced that he would be seeking the death penalty for the accused. The following day, the jury was selected, resulting in a jury composed of twelve white men. Opening statements were made on January 21. Utilizing the gay panic defense, Baldwin stated that, while Farrell had gone to Cafe Lafitte with the intent of robbing a gay man, he had no interest in engaging in violence and that the beating that he gave Rios was in self-defense against unwanted sexual advances. Additionally, by the time that the beating occurred, they argued, Farrell had given up on the idea of robbing Rios, and that the act of taking the wallet came about as an afterthought as revenge against Rios. This last point was considered exceptionally important to the defense, as, under Louisiana's felony murder rule, the death penalty could only be applied if the killing occurred in the service of a robbery. The defense also highlighted the coroner's description of Rios's "eggshell cranium", calling him a "medical freak" and alleging that the type of assault Rios experienced may not have been lethal had it not been for his skull. Additionally, the defense pointed out the remorse that the three individuals experienced after the event, saying that they put the money they had stolen in a church poor box. Later that day, several witnesses, including the coroner, several Tulane students, and multiple police officers, gave their testimony.

On January 22, the three defendants began to testify, starting with Farrell and ending the following day with Drennan. While the defendants admitted that they had beaten Rios, they maintained that it had not been their intent to kill him. Closing statements were made later that day. In a rebuttal to Baldwin's closing statements, Dowling called Farrell, Calvo, and Drennan "educated thugs" who were attempting to defend their actions by slandering Rios's reputation. Dowling further reiterated his argument to the jury that the robbery had been a premeditated act, saying, "They took his life because they wanted to rob him. He had a right to live, not be murdered, and a greater right to his reputation after his death." Dowling ended his statements by calling the defendants' act of putting the stolen money into a poor box "sacrilegious".

=== Verdict ===
Following closing statements, the jury was presented with instructions and allowed to deliberate. For each of the defendants, they were given four possible verdicts to decide upon: Guilty as charged, Guilty without Capital Punishment, Guilty of manslaughter, or Not Guilty. The first verdict would have sentenced the defendant to death by electrocution, the second to a life sentence in prison, the third to a prison sentence not exceeding 21 years, and the fourth to a discharge. Their deliberations lasted only two hours and 15 minutes. Upon returning to the courtroom, they announced verdicts of not guilty for all three defendants. Following their verdict for Farrell, who was viewed as the most likely among the three to be found guilty, the courtroom erupted in cheers. The celebrations, described by the Times-Picayune as "jubilant", were such that the judge had to declare order before the jury could continue. The following day, the New Orleans States-Item newspaper ran a front-page story on the verdicts.

=== Further litigation ===
Following the murder trial, litigation continued for the next several years. In August 1959, Rios's mother hired Garrison to represent her in a wrongful death claim against the Calvo, Drennan, and Farrell trio, seeking compensatory damages for their involvement in his death. Farrell was a college student in Louisiana, but officially a resident of North Carolina, requiring Garrison to file paperwork against him in both states. However, this paperwork was not filed until October 1959, 13 months after Rios's death. As Louisiana had a one-year statute of limitations on wrongful death claims, the case was thrown out.

On January 24, 1959, a day after the murder trial had concluded, Dowling announced that he would be pursuing additional charges against the defendants for robbery, and by January 27, a grand jury indicted the three on two charges: conspiracy to commit robbery and simple robbery. The defendants' bail was set at $3,500 ($38,700 in 2025). The defense attorneys argued that the new case would amount to double jeopardy. In October 1959, Judge George P. Platt heard arguments over the case, and the following month, he ruled that a new trial would constitute double jeopardy. Dowling filed an appeal with the Louisiana Supreme Court, who sided with him and remanded the case back. The defense sought certiorari from the Supreme Court of the United States, which declined in November 1960, thus clearing the way for the trial to continue in New Orleans.

However, after the defendants were granted permission to leave the jurisdiction of New Orleans in February 1959, the three moved out of the city, leading to complications in beginning the new trial. Calvo returned to Panama and never returned to New Orleans despite efforts from the court in the form of subpoenas and summons. Drennan transferred to the University of Miami, while Farrell found employment in North Carolina and later Ohio. Multiple continuances on the case were granted over the span of several years. In 1962, Dowling lost his reelection campaign for district attorney to Garrison, who, according to Delery, lacked the same desire to see the case through as Dowling had. In October 1964, Drennan and Farrell appeared in court in New Orleans regarding the robbery charges and accepted a plea bargain where they pled guilty, were sentenced to six-month sentences in the Orleans Parish Prison, but immediately received a suspension "during defendants good behavior", ultimately not serving any time. In 1966, the district attorney's office filed a notice of nolle prosequi regarding Calvo, ending their efforts to bring him to court and, as a result, ending any legal activities related to Rios's murder.

Many records from the legal activities surrounding the murder trial and subsequent litigation were stored on microfilm at the Louisiana State Archive and Research Library in Baton Rouge, Louisiana. However, some records that were stored at the courthouse in New Orleans, including all transcripts from the court proceedings, were destroyed by flooding caused by Hurricane Katrina.

== Legacy ==
Discussing Rios's legacy in 2017, Delery notes:

He was soon remembered in New Orleans only by a few people, most of them gay men, who recalled his killing with horror, both for its own sake, and for what it implied about the fate of any gay man who might encounter one or more young men out on a mission to roll a queer. Otherwise, except for a couple of articles, some references in a few books on LGBT history, and a few pages in an undergraduate thesis, Fernando Rios has been forgotten.

A similar sentiment is expressed in a 2018 article of the LGBTQ website Ambush Magazine, which stated that that what happened to Rios "was a seminal moment in gay New Orleans history that has largely been forgotten. However, in 2017, Delery published a book on the murder, prompting renewed focus on the murder from multiple publications. Multiple publications have labeled the Rios incident a hate crime and an example of gay bashing. Concerning a motive or rationale, Delery opines that Farrell may have been a "sexually confused young man ... who was trying to eliminate the confusion by acting out against someone who represented his own conflict". Delery also notes that the act may have been a way for Farrell, who had only recently moved to the city and met the men he was interacting with that night, to demonstrate his machismo and that he may have also been influenced by the prevalent anti-gay and anti-Mexican rhetoric prevalent in American culture at the time. In an interview conducted after Farrell's death in 2016 with his son, Sean, he told Delery that he believed his father may have been trying to show off to his companions in an act of braggadocio.

On November 16, 2018, Delery read excerpts of his book at the Cafe Lafitte, and on February 26, 2024, in an event co-organized by the LGBT+ Archives Project of Louisiana and the Queer Student Alliance at Tulane University, Delery participated in a discussion on the incident that was followed by a vigil. According to Delery, the event marked the first time that Tulane had publicly acknowledged the incident that had involved three of their students. In his discussions on the event, Delery notes that there had been significant progress made by the LGBTQ community in the United States at large and New Orleans in specific, with the city being considered one of the most LGBTQ-friendly cities in the country in 2024. However, he also stated that there are some comparisons to be drawn between the killing and various anti-LGBTQ acts and measures in the United States, including the 2016 Pulse nightclub shooting that left dozens of primarily Latino gay men dead.

== See also ==
- History of violence against LGBTQ people in the United States
- UpStairs Lounge arson attack, a 1973 arson attack on a gay bar in New Orleans

== Sources ==
- Campanella, Richard (2014). Bourbon Street: A History. Baton Rouge, Louisiana: Louisiana State University Press. ISBN 978-0-8071-5505-9. OCLC 857141260.
- Delery, Clayton (2017). Out for Queer Blood: The Murder of Fernando Rios and the Failure of New Orleans Justice. Foreword by Robert L. Camina. Jefferson, North Carolilna: Exposit Books. ISBN 978-1-4766-6884-0. OCLC 1007499105.
- Kepner, Jim (1998). Rough News, Daring Views: 1950s' Pioneer Gay Press Journalism. Gay & Lesbian Studies. Foreword by Wayne R. Dynes; Preface by Mark Thompson. Binghamton, New York: Haworth Press. ISBN 978-1-56023-896-6. OCLC 36930666.
- "Fernando Rios Remembered". LGBT+ Archives Project of Louisiana. February 2024. Archived from the original on December 24, 2024.
- Perez, Frank (February 27, 2018a). "Moments in Gay New Orleans History". Ambush Magazine. Archived from the original on July 25, 2024.
- Perez, Frank (March 2, 2018b). "Out For Queer Blood: The Murder of Fernando Rios and the Failure of New Orleans Justice by Clayton Delery". Ambush Magazine. Archived from the original on August 3, 2024.
- Perez, Frank (November 2023). "When the Courtroom Cheered: A Mid-Century Miscarriage of Justice". French Quarter Journal. Archived from the original on December 24, 2024.
- Perez, Frank (February 21, 2024). "Fernando Rios Memorial Event Announced". Ambush Magazine. Archived from the original on July 12, 2024.
- Polchin, James (2020) [2019]. Indecent Advances: A Hidden History of True Crime and Prejudice Before Stonewall (First paperback ed.). Berkeley, California: Counterpoint. ISBN 978-1-64009-387-4. OCLC 1112261710.
- Satchu, Alya (March 6, 2024). "Author discusses 1950s killing of gay man by Tulane students". Tulane Hullabaloo. Archived from the original on July 24, 2024.
