= TimeWars =

Cover sample of "The Ivanhoe Gambit", the first book in the series.

TimeWars is a series of twelve science fiction paperback books created and written by author Simon Hawke beginning in 1984. The story involves the adventures of an organization tasked with protecting history from being changed by time travelers. In the world of the series, many people and events considered fictional are historical, and vice versa; the action of each book in the series weaves in and out of the events of a famous work of literature. For example, in the first book in the series, time travelers contesting the fate of Richard I of England become caught up in Walter Scott's Ivanhoe.

== Books ==
- The Ivanhoe Gambit (1984)
- The Timekeeper Conspiracy (1984)
- The Pimpernel Plot (1984)
- The Zenda Vendetta (1985)
- The Nautilus Sanction (1985)
- The Khyber Connection (1986)
- The Argonaut Affair (1987)
- The Dracula Caper (1988)
- The Lilliput Legion (1989)
- The Hellfire Rebellion (1990)
- The Cleopatra Crisis (1990)
- The Six-Gun Solution (1991)
- The Sumpter Scenario (2001) (Short Story, available in "A Date Which Will Live in Infamy"
